= Bernt Sjöberg =

Swedish wheelchair curler and Paralympian

- Curler ♂
- Born: 2 August 1955 (age 71)

Team
- Curling club: Södertälje CK, Södertälje

Curling career
- Member Association: Sweden
- World Wheelchair Championship: 5 (2002, 2004, 2005, 2007, 2008)
- Paralympic: 1 (2006)
Medal record
Wheelchair curling
Winter Paralympics
Bronze medal – third place	2006 Turin

Bernt Sjöberg (born 2 August 1955) is a Swedish wheelchair curler.

He participated in 2006 Winter Paralympic Games where Swedish team won bronze medals.

== Teams ==
Season	Skip	Third	Second	Lead	Alternate	Coach	Events
2001–02	Jalle Jungnell	Glenn Ikonen	Anette Svensson	Bernt Sjöberg	Claes Hultling	Thomas Wilhelm	WWhCC 2002 (4th)
2003–04	Jalle Jungnell	Glenn Ikonen	Bernt Sjöberg	Anette Wilhelm	Rolf Johansson	Thomas Wilhelm	WWhCC 2004 (7th)
2004–05	Jalle Jungnell	Glenn Ikonen	Rolf Johansson	Anette Wilhelm	Bernt Sjöberg	Olle Brudsten, Thomas Wilhelm	WWhCC 2005 (4th)
2005–06	Jalle Jungnell	Glenn Ikonen	Rolf Johansson	Anette Wilhelm	Bernt Sjöberg	Olle Brudsten, Thomas Wilhelm	WPG 2006 (bronze)
2007–08	Jalle Jungnell	Glenn Ikonen	Bernt Sjöberg	Anna Hammarlind	Kristina Ulander		WWhCC-QE 2008
2007–08	Jalle Jungnell	Glenn Ikonen	Bernt Sjöberg	Kristina Ulander	Anna Hammarlind	Olle Brudsten	WWhCC 2008 (6th)
2013–14	Patrik Burman	Michael Sahlén	Kristina Ulander	Bernt Sjöberg			SWhCC 2014 (gold)

== Private life ==
His children also are a curlers: son Axel is a runner-up of 2012 World Junior Championship and 2019 Swedish mixed champion curler, daughter Fanny plays in team skipped by Isabella Wranå, she is a two-time World junior champion (2017, 2018), 2018 Swedish women's champion curler and 2019 Winter Universiade champion.
