= Jim Primavera =

Canadian wheelchair curler

- Curler ♂
- Born: February 18, 1962 (age 64)

Curling career
- Member Association: Canada
- World Wheelchair Championship: 3 (2002, 2004, 2005)
Medal record
Wheelchair curling
World Wheelchair Curling Championship
Silver medal – second place	2002 Sursee
Bronze medal – third place	2004 Sursee
Canadian Wheelchair Curling Championship
Gold medal – first place	2004 London
Gold medal – first place	2005 Richmond

Jim Primavera (born February 18, 1962) is a Canadian wheelchair curler.

== Teams ==
Season	Skip	Third	Second	Lead	Alternate	Coach	Events
2001–02	Chris Daw	Don Bell	Jim Primavera	Karen Blachford	Richard Fraser	Tom Ward	WWhCC 2002 (silver)
2003–04	Chris Daw	Bruce McAninch	Jim Primavera	Karen Blachford		Amy McAninch	CWhCC 2004 (gold); WWhCC 2004 (bronze)
2004–05	Chris Daw	Bruce McAninch	Jim Primavera	Karen Blachford	Gerry Austgarden	Amy Reid, Joe Rea	CWhCC 2005 (gold); WWhCC 2005 (6th)
