= Gerry Austgarden =

Canadian wheelchair curler

- Curler ♂
- Born: January 7, 1964 (age 62); Fort St. John, British Columbia

Team
- Curling club: Kelowna CC, Kelowna, BC

Curling career
- Member Association: Canada
- World Wheelchair Championship: 3 (2005, 2007, 2008)
- Paralympic: 1 (2006)
Medal record
Wheelchair curling
Winter Paralympics
Gold medal – first place	2006 Turin
Canadian Wheelchair Curling Championship
Gold medal – first place	2005 Richmond
Gold medal – first place	2006 Richmond
Gold medal – first place	2015 Boucherville

Gerald "Gerry" Austgarden (born January 7, 1964) is a Canadian wheelchair curler. He is a 2006 Winter Paralympics champion.

== Teams ==
Season	Skip	Third	Second	Lead	Alternate	Coach	Events
2004–05	Chris Daw	Bruce McAninch	Jim Primavera	Karen Blachford	Gerry Austgarden	Amy Reid, Joe Rea	CWhCC 2005 (gold); WWhCC 2005 (6th)
2005–06	Chris Daw	Gerry Austgarden	Gary Cormack	Sonja Gaudet	Karen Blachford (WPG)		CWhCC 2006 (gold); WPG 2006 (gold)
2006–07	Chris Daw	Gerry Austgarden	Gary Cormack	Sonja Gaudet	Ina Forrest	Joe Rea	WWhCC 2007 (4th)
2007–08	Darryl Neighbour	Gerry Austgarden	Ina Forrest	Sonja Gaudet	Gary Cormack	Joe Rea	WWhCC 2008 (4th)
2014–15	Gerry Austgarden	Darryl Neighbour	Frank LaBounty	Alison Duddy		Brad Burton	CWhCC 2015 (gold)
