= Manfred Bolliger =

Swiss wheelchair curler and Paralympian

- Curler ♂
- Born: 14 November 1962 (age 63); Bern

Curling career
- Member Association: Switzerland
- World Wheelchair Championship: 6 (2002, 2004, 2005, 2007, 2008, 2009)
- Paralympic: 2 (2006, 2010)
Medal record
Wheelchair curling
World Wheelchair Championship
Gold medal – first place	2002 Sursee
Silver medal – second place	2004 Sursee
Silver medal – second place	2007 Sollefteå
Bronze medal – third place	2005 Glasgow

Manfred Bolliger (born 14 November 1962 in Bern) is a Swiss wheelchair curler.

He participated in the 2006 and 2010 Winter Paralympics where Swiss team finished on sixth and seventh places respectively.

== Teams ==
Season	Skip	Third	Second	Lead	Alternate	Coach	Events
2001–02	Urs Bucher	Cesare Cassani	Manfred Bolliger	Therese Kämpfer	Silvia Obrist	Stephan Rauch	WWhCC 2002 (gold)
2003–04	Urs Bucher	Manfred Bolliger	Cesare Cassani	Therese Kämpfer	Otto Erb	Heinz Sommerhalder	WWhCC 2004 (silver)
2004–05	Urs Bucher	Manfred Bolliger	Cesare Cassani	Therese Kämpfer	Erwin Lauper	Urs Keller	WWhCC 2005 (bronze)
2005–06	Urs Bucher	Manfred Bolliger	Cesare Cassani	Madeleine Wildi	Erwin Lauper		WPG 2006 (6th)
2006–07	Manfred Bolliger	Erwin Lauper	Cesare Cassani	Madeleine Wildi	Claudia Tosse	Nadia Röthlisberger-Raspe	WWhCC 2007 (silver)
2007–08	Manfred Bolliger	Erwin Lauper	Cesare Cassani	Madeleine Wildi	Therese Kämpfer	Nadia Röthlisberger-Raspe	WWhCC 2008 (8th)
2008–09	Manfred Bolliger	Martin Bieri	Daniel Meyer	Anton Kehrli	Melanie Villars	Anton Ruesser, Nadia Röthlisberger-Raspe	WWhCC 2009 (10th)
2009–10	Manfred Bolliger	Claudia Hüttenmoser	Daniel Meyer	Anton Kehrli	Martin Bieri	Nadia Röthlisberger-Raspe	WPG 2010 (7th)
2010–11	Manfred Bolliger	Claudia Hüttenmoser	Hieronymus Liechtenhan	Daniel Meyer	Martin Bieri	Stephan Pfister	WWhCQ 2010 (5th)
2011–12	Manfred Bolliger	Felix Wagner	Claudia Hüttenmoser	Eric Decorvet	Melanie Villars	Stephan Pfister	WWhCQ 2011 (5th)
