= Therese Kämpfer =

Swiss wheelchair curler

- Curler ♀
- Born: 13 August 1958 (age 68)

Curling career
- Member Association: Switzerland
- World Wheelchair Championship: 4 (2002, 2004, 2005, 2008)
Medal record
Wheelchair curling
World Wheelchair Championship
| Gold medal – first place | 2002 Sursee |
| Silver medal – second place | 2004 Sursee |
| Bronze medal – third place | 2005 Glasgow |
Swiss Wheelchair Championship
| Gold medal – first place | 2004 Thun |
| Gold medal – first place | 2005 Bern |
| Gold medal – first place | 2008 Gstaad |

Therese Kämpfer (born 13 August 1958) is a Swiss wheelchair curler.

== Teams ==
| Season | Skip | Third | Second | Lead | Alternate | Coach | Events |
|---|---|---|---|---|---|---|---|
| 2001–02 | Urs Bucher | Cesare Cassani | Manfred Bolliger | Therese Kämpfer | Silvia Obrist | Stephan Rauch | WWhCC 2002 (gold) |
| 2003–04 | Urs Bucher | Manfred Bolliger | Cesare Cassani | Therese Kämpfer | Otto Erb | Heinz Sommerhalder | WWhCC 2004 (silver) |
| 2004–05 | Urs Bucher | Manfred Bolliger | Cesare Cassani | Therese Kämpfer | Erwin Lauper | Urs Keller | WWhCC 2005 (bronze) |
| 2007–08 | Manfred Bolliger | Erwin Lauper | Cesare Cassani | Madeleine Wildi | Therese Kämpfer | Nadia Röthlisberger-Raspe | WWhCC 2008 (8th) |
