= 2004 World Wheelchair Curling Championship =

- Host city: Sursee, Switzerland
- Dates: January 19–24
- Winner: Scotland
- Skip: Frank Duffy
- Third: Michael McCreadie
- Second: Ken Dickson
- Lead: Angie Malone
- Alternate: James Sellar
- Finalist: Switzerland (Urs Bucher)

The 2004 World Wheelchair Curling Championship was held from January 19 to 24 in Sursee, Switzerland.

== Teams ==
=== Group A ===
| Bulgaria | Denmark | Norway | Scotland |
|---|---|---|---|
| Skip: Ivan Shopov Third: Pavel Savov; Second: Svetozar Kirov; Lead: Neli Sabeva; Alternate: Rumen Panayotov; Coach: Dimitar Dimitrov | Skip: Kenneth Ørbæk Third: Jørn Kristensen; Second: Rosita Jensen; Lead: Bjarne Jensen; Alternate: Pernille Pirchert; Coach: Per Christensen | Skip: Paul Aksel Johansen Third: Geir Arne Skogstad; Second: Lene Tystad; Lead: Trine Fissum; Coach: Gry Roaldseth | Skip: Frank Duffy Third: Michael McCreadie; Second: Ken Dickson; Lead: Angie Malone; Alternate: James Sellar; Coach: Jane Sanderson |
| Switzerland | United States | Wales | |
| Skip: Urs Bucher Third: Manfred Bolliger; Second: Cesare Cassani; Lead: Therese Kämpfer; Alternate: Otto Erb; Coach: Heinz Sommerhalder | Skip: Wes Smith Third: Mark Taylor; Second: Sam Woodward; Lead: Loren Kinney; Alternate: Danelle Libby; Coach: Diane Brown | Skip: Mike Preston Third: Ian Jones; Second: Clark Shiels; Lead: Marion Harrison; Coach: John Stone | |

=== Group B ===
| Canada | England | Italy |
|---|---|---|
| Skip: Chris Daw Third: Bruce McAninch; Second: Jim Primavera; Lead: Karen Blachford; Coach: Amy McAninch | Skip: Ian Wakenshaw Third: Noel Thomas; Second: George Windram; Lead: Valerie Robertson; Coach: Joan Reed | Skip: Egidio Marchese Third: Orazio Fagone; Second: Rita Dal Monte; Lead: Fabio Tripodi; Alternate: Pierino Gaspard; Coach: Mauro Maino |
| Russia | South Korea | Sweden |
| Skip: Victor Ershov Third: Valeriy Chepilko; Second: Andrey Smirnov; Lead: Oxana Slesarenko; Alternate: Nikolay Melnikov; Coach: Oleg Narinyan | Skip: Kim Hak-sung Third: Kim Myung-jin; Second: Cho Yae-lee; Lead: Cho Yang-hyun; Alternate: Kim Kab-seung; Coach: Yang Se-young | Skip: Jalle Jungnell Third: Glenn Ikonen; Second: Bernt Sjöberg; Lead: Anette Wilhelm; Alternate: Rolf Johansson; Coach: Thomas Wilhelm |

== Round robin standings ==
Key
| Teams to Playoffs |
| Teams to Tiebreaker |

| Group A | Skip | W | L |
|---|---|---|---|
| Scotland | Frank Duffy | 6 | 0 |
| Switzerland | Urs Bucher | 4 | 2 |
| United States | Wes Smith | 4 | 2 |
| Denmark | Kenneth Ørbæk | 3 | 3 |
| Bulgaria | Ivan Shopov | 2 | 4 |
| Norway | Paul Aksel Johansen | 2 | 4 |
| Wales | Mike Preston | 0 | 6 |

| Group B | Skip | W | L |
|---|---|---|---|
| England | Ian Wakenshaw | 3 | 2 |
| Canada | Chris Daw | 3 | 2 |
| Italy | Egidio Marchese | 3 | 2 |
| Sweden | Jalle Jungnell | 2 | 3 |
| Russia | Victor Ershov | 2 | 3 |
| South Korea | Kim Hak-sung | 2 | 3 |

== Round robin results ==
=== Group A ===
==== Draw 1 ====
Tuesday, January 20, 14:00

| Sheet A | 1 | 2 | 3 | 4 | 5 | 6 | EE | Final |
| United States (Smith) 🔨 | 1 | 2 | 0 | 1 | 0 | 0 | 0 | 4 |
| Denmark (Ørbæk) | 0 | 0 | 2 | 0 | 1 | 1 | 1 | 5 |

| Sheet C | 1 | 2 | 3 | 4 | 5 | 6 | Final |
| Switzerland (Bucher) 🔨 | 1 | 4 | 4 | 2 | 2 | 1 | 14 |
| Bulgaria (Shopov) | 0 | 0 | 0 | 0 | 0 | 0 | 0 |

| Sheet D | 1 | 2 | 3 | 4 | 5 | 6 | Final |
| Scotland (Duffy) 🔨 | 3 | 2 | 0 | 0 | 1 | 4 | 10 |
| Norway (Johansen) | 0 | 0 | 1 | 1 | 0 | 0 | 2 |

==== Draw 2 ====
Tuesday, January 20, 19:00

| Sheet D | 1 | 2 | 3 | 4 | 5 | 6 | Final |
| Switzerland (Bucher) 🔨 | 2 | 3 | 0 | 2 | 2 | 0 | 9 |
| Wales (Preston) | 0 | 0 | 1 | 0 | 0 | 0 | 1 |

| Sheet E | 1 | 2 | 3 | 4 | 5 | 6 | Final |
| Bulgaria (Shopov) 🔨 | 0 | 2 | 1 | 0 | 1 | 0 | 4 |
| Norway (Johansen) | 0 | 0 | 0 | 1 | 0 | 1 | 2 |

| Sheet F | 1 | 2 | 3 | 4 | 5 | 6 | Final |
| Scotland (Duffy) 🔨 | 2 | 3 | 1 | 0 | 0 | 1 | 7 |
| United States (Smith) | 0 | 0 | 0 | 3 | 2 | 0 | 5 |

==== Draw 3 ====
Wednesday, January 21, 9:00

| Sheet A | 1 | 2 | 3 | 4 | 5 | 6 | Final |
| Bulgaria (Shopov) 🔨 | 0 | 3 | 0 | 1 | 1 | 1 | 6 |
| Wales (Preston) | 2 | 0 | 1 | 0 | 0 | 0 | 3 |

| Sheet B | 1 | 2 | 3 | 4 | 5 | 6 | Final |
| Switzerland (Bucher) 🔨 | 0 | 0 | 0 | 2 | 0 | 0 | 2 |
| Scotland (Duffy) | 2 | 1 | 1 | 0 | 4 | 2 | 10 |

| Sheet C | 1 | 2 | 3 | 4 | 5 | 6 | Final |
| Norway (Johansen) 🔨 | 0 | 0 | 1 | 0 | 1 | 4 | 6 |
| Denmark (Ørbæk) | 1 | 1 | 0 | 1 | 0 | 0 | 3 |

==== Draw 4 ====
Wednesday, January 21, 14:00

| Sheet B | 1 | 2 | 3 | 4 | 5 | 6 | Final |
| United States (Smith) 🔨 | 0 | 4 | 2 | 0 | 1 | 1 | 8 |
| Bulgaria (Shopov) | 1 | 0 | 0 | 1 | 0 | 0 | 2 |

| Sheet E | 1 | 2 | 3 | 4 | 5 | 6 | Final |
| Denmark (Ørbæk) 🔨 | 0 | 0 | 0 | 1 | 1 | 0 | 2 |
| Scotland (Duffy) | 3 | 2 | 1 | 0 | 0 | 1 | 7 |

| Sheet F | 1 | 2 | 3 | 4 | 5 | 6 | Final |
| Wales (Preston) 🔨 | 2 | 0 | 0 | 0 | 0 | 0 | 2 |
| Norway (Johansen) | 0 | 3 | 2 | 2 | 2 | 2 | 11 |

==== Draw 5 ====
Wednesday, January 21, 19:00

| Sheet A | 1 | 2 | 3 | 4 | 5 | 6 | Final |
| Scotland (Duffy) 🔨 | 4 | 1 | 2 | 0 | 6 | 0 | 13 |
| Bulgaria (Shopov) | 0 | 0 | 0 | 1 | 0 | 1 | 2 |

| Sheet B | 1 | 2 | 3 | 4 | 5 | 6 | Final |
| Denmark (Ørbæk) 🔨 | 2 | 1 | 1 | 2 | 0 | 0 | 6 |
| Wales (Preston) | 0 | 0 | 0 | 0 | 1 | 2 | 3 |

| Sheet C | 1 | 2 | 3 | 4 | 5 | 6 | Final |
| United States (Smith) 🔨 | 2 | 1 | 0 | 0 | 1 | 2 | 6 |
| Switzerland (Bucher) | 0 | 0 | 1 | 4 | 0 | 0 | 5 |

==== Draw 6 ====
Thursday, January 22, 9:00

| Sheet D | 1 | 2 | 3 | 4 | 5 | 6 | Final |
| Bulgaria (Shopov) 🔨 | 0 | 2 | 0 | 1 | 0 | 0 | 3 |
| Denmark (Ørbæk) | 4 | 0 | 1 | 0 | 2 | 2 | 9 |

| Sheet E | 1 | 2 | 3 | 4 | 5 | 6 | Final |
| Wales (Preston) 🔨 | 0 | 0 | 0 | 0 | 0 | 0 | 0 |
| United States (Smith) | 1 | 2 | 2 | 3 | 2 | 2 | 12 |

| Sheet F | 1 | 2 | 3 | 4 | 5 | 6 | Final |
| Norway (Johansen) 🔨 | 0 | 0 | 0 | 0 | 0 | 1 | 1 |
| Switzerland (Bucher) | 3 | 1 | 2 | 1 | 2 | 0 | 9 |

==== Draw 7 ====
Thursday, January 22, 14:00

| Sheet A | 1 | 2 | 3 | 4 | 5 | 6 | Final |
| Denmark (Ørbæk) 🔨 | 0 | 3 | 0 | 0 | 0 | 1 | 4 |
| Switzerland (Bucher) | 2 | 0 | 1 | 2 | 1 | 0 | 6 |

| Sheet B | 1 | 2 | 3 | 4 | 5 | 6 | Final |
| Norway (Johansen) 🔨 | 1 | 0 | 0 | 0 | 1 | 1 | 3 |
| United States (Smith) | 0 | 2 | 1 | 0 | 0 | 0 | 4 |

| Sheet C | 1 | 2 | 3 | 4 | 5 | 6 | Final |
| Wales (Preston) 🔨 | 1 | 0 | 0 | 2 | 1 | 0 | 4 |
| Scotland (Duffy) | 0 | 2 | 1 | 0 | 0 | 2 | 5 |

=== Group B ===
==== Draw 1 ====
Tuesday, January 20, 19:00

| Sheet A | 1 | 2 | 3 | 4 | 5 | 6 | Final |
| Canada (Daw) | 2 | 0 | 1 | 0 | 0 | 0 | 3 |
| England (Wakenshaw) 🔨 | 0 | 1 | 0 | 1 | 1 | 3 | 6 |

| Sheet B | 1 | 2 | 3 | 4 | 5 | 6 | Final |
| Italy (Marchese) 🔨 | 5 | 0 | 0 | 0 | 0 | 2 | 7 |
| Russia (Ershov) | 0 | 1 | 1 | 1 | 2 | 0 | 5 |

| Sheet C | 1 | 2 | 3 | 4 | 5 | 6 | Final |
| Sweden (Jungnell) 🔨 | 2 | 0 | 0 | 0 | 2 | 1 | 5 |
| South Korea (Kim) | 0 | 1 | 1 | 1 | 0 | 0 | 3 |

==== Draw 2 ====
Wednesday, January 21, 9:00

| Sheet D | 1 | 2 | 3 | 4 | 5 | 6 | Final |
| Italy (Marchese) 🔨 | 1 | 0 | 0 | 0 | 0 | 0 | 1 |
| South Korea (Kim) | 0 | 1 | 3 | 1 | 1 | 4 | 10 |

| Sheet E | 1 | 2 | 3 | 4 | 5 | 6 | Final |
| Sweden (Jungnell) | 0 | 0 | 1 | 0 | 0 | 0 | 1 |
| Canada (Daw) 🔨 | 2 | 1 | 0 | 2 | 2 | 0 | 7 |

| Sheet F | 1 | 2 | 3 | 4 | 5 | 6 | Final |
| Russia (Ershov) 🔨 | 1 | 1 | 0 | 4 | 2 | 1 | 9 |
| England (Wakenshaw) | 0 | 0 | 3 | 0 | 0 | 0 | 3 |

==== Draw 3 ====
Wednesday, January 21, 19:00

| Sheet D | 1 | 2 | 3 | 4 | 5 | 6 | Final |
| Russia (Ershov) | 0 | 0 | 0 | 0 | 0 | 2 | 2 |
| Canada (Daw) 🔨 | 1 | 3 | 1 | 2 | 1 | 0 | 8 |

| Sheet E | 1 | 2 | 3 | 4 | 5 | 6 | Final |
| England (Wakenshaw) 🔨 | 0 | 1 | 2 | 0 | 1 | 1 | 5 |
| South Korea (Kim) | 2 | 0 | 0 | 2 | 0 | 0 | 4 |

| Sheet F | 1 | 2 | 3 | 4 | 5 | 6 | Final |
| Italy (Marchese) | 0 | 1 | 4 | 0 | 1 | 1 | 7 |
| Sweden (Jungnell) 🔨 | 2 | 0 | 0 | 3 | 0 | 0 | 5 |

==== Draw 4 ====
Thursday, January 22, 9:00

| Sheet A | 1 | 2 | 3 | 4 | 5 | 6 | Final |
| Russia (Ershov) 🔨 | 2 | 0 | 0 | 1 | 0 | 2 | 5 |
| Sweden (Jungnell) | 0 | 3 | 1 | 0 | 4 | 0 | 8 |

| Sheet B | 1 | 2 | 3 | 4 | 5 | 6 | Final |
| South Korea (Kim) 🔨 | 0 | 1 | 0 | 2 | 2 | 0 | 5 |
| Canada (Daw) | 1 | 0 | 2 | 0 | 0 | 1 | 4 |

| Sheet C | 1 | 2 | 3 | 4 | 5 | 6 | EE | Final |
| England (Wakenshaw) 🔨 | 0 | 1 | 0 | 0 | 1 | 1 | 0 | 3 |
| Italy (Marchese) | 1 | 0 | 1 | 1 | 0 | 0 | 1 | 4 |

==== Draw 5 ====
Thursday, January 22, 14:00

| Sheet D | 1 | 2 | 3 | 4 | 5 | 6 | Final |
| Sweden (Jungnell) 🔨 | 0 | 0 | 1 | 0 | 0 | 0 | 1 |
| England (Wakenshaw) | 1 | 1 | 0 | 1 | 1 | 2 | 6 |

| Sheet E | 1 | 2 | 3 | 4 | 5 | 6 | Final |
| Canada (Daw) | 0 | 3 | 0 | 3 | 2 | 1 | 9 |
| Italy (Marchese) 🔨 | 1 | 0 | 1 | 0 | 0 | 0 | 2 |

| Sheet F | 1 | 2 | 3 | 4 | 5 | 6 | Final |
| South Korea (Kim) 🔨 | 0 | 2 | 0 | 0 | 0 | 2 | 4 |
| Russia (Ershov) | 2 | 0 | 1 | 2 | 1 | 0 | 6 |

== Tiebreakers ==
Friday, January 23, 9:00

| Sheet C | 1 | 2 | 3 | 4 | 5 | 6 | Final |
| Switzerland (Bucher) | 0 | 1 | 1 | 2 | 0 | 1 | 5 |
| United States (Smith) 🔨 | 1 | 0 | 0 | 0 | 1 | 0 | 2 |

Switzerland advances to the playoffs.

| Sheet E | 1 | 2 | 3 | 4 | 5 | 6 | Final |
| Norway (Johansen) | 0 | 0 | 0 | 2 | 0 | 0 | 2 |
| Bulgaria (Shopov) 🔨 | 1 | 2 | 2 | 0 | 3 | 1 | 9 |

Bulgaria moves to the ninth place classification game, while Norway moves to the eleventh place classification game.

== Classification Games ==
Friday, January 23, 19:00

Fifth place

| Team | 1 | 2 | 3 | 4 | 5 | 6 | Final |
| United States (Smith) 🔨 | 3 | 1 | 1 | 1 | 2 | 0 | 8 |
| Italy (Marchese) | 0 | 0 | 0 | 0 | 0 | 5 | 5 |

Seventh place

| Team | 1 | 2 | 3 | 4 | 5 | 6 | Final |
| Denmark (Ørbæk) 🔨 | 0 | 0 | 1 | 0 | 1 | 0 | 2 |
| Sweden (Jungnell) | 1 | 3 | 0 | 1 | 0 | 1 | 6 |

Ninth place

| Team | 1 | 2 | 3 | 4 | 5 | 6 | Final |
| Bulgaria (Shopov) | 1 | 0 | 1 | 0 | 0 | 2 | 4 |
| Russia (Ershov) 🔨 | 0 | 1 | 0 | 3 | 1 | 0 | 5 |

Eleventh place

| Sheet F | 1 | 2 | 3 | 4 | 5 | 6 | Final |
| Norway (Johansen) 🔨 | 0 | 1 | 0 | 1 | 0 | 0 | 2 |
| South Korea (Kim) | 1 | 0 | 2 | 0 | 2 | 1 | 6 |

== Playoffs ==
Semifinals
A1 | Scotland | 10
B2 | Canada | 4
A2 | Switzerland | 8
B1 | England | 1

Gold Medal Game
A1 | Scotland | 6
A2 | Switzerland | 3
Bronze Medal Game
B2 | Canada | 6
B1 | England | 5

=== Semifinals ===
Friday, January 23, 19:00

| Sheet B | 1 | 2 | 3 | 4 | 5 | 6 | Final |
| Scotland (Duffy) 🔨 | 3 | 0 | 0 | 4 | 2 | 1 | 10 |
| Canada (Daw) | 0 | 2 | 2 | 0 | 0 | 0 | 4 |

| Sheet D | 1 | 2 | 3 | 4 | 5 | 6 | Final |
| Switzerland (Bucher) 🔨 | 0 | 1 | 2 | 3 | 1 | 1 | 8 |
| England (Wakenshaw) | 1 | 0 | 0 | 0 | 0 | 0 | 1 |

=== Bronze medal game ===
Saturday, January 24, 11:00

| Sheet E | 1 | 2 | 3 | 4 | 5 | 6 | EE | Final |
| Canada (Daw) | 0 | 1 | 0 | 3 | 0 | 1 | 1 | 6 |
| England (Wakenshaw) 🔨 | 1 | 0 | 1 | 0 | 3 | 0 | 0 | 5 |

=== Gold medal game ===
Saturday, January 24, 11:00

| Sheet C | 1 | 2 | 3 | 4 | 5 | 6 | Final |
| Scotland (Duffy) 🔨 | 1 | 1 | 0 | 2 | 1 | 1 | 6 |
| Switzerland (Bucher) | 0 | 0 | 3 | 0 | 0 | 0 | 3 |

2004 World Wheelchair Curling Championship
(Scotland)
Scotland
1st title
