= Don Bell (curler) =

Canadian wheelchair curler

- Curler ♂

Curling career
- Member Association: Canada
- World Wheelchair Championship: 1 (2002)
Medal record
Wheelchair curling
World Wheelchair Curling Championship
| Silver medal – second place | 2002 Sursee |

Don Bell is a Canadian wheelchair curler.

== Teams ==
| Season | Skip | Third | Second | Lead | Alternate | Coach | Events |
|---|---|---|---|---|---|---|---|
| 2001–02 | Chris Daw | Don Bell | Jim Primavera | Karen Blachford | Richard Fraser | Tom Ward | WWhCC 2002 (silver) |
