= James Sellar (curler) =

Scottish and British wheelchair curler and Paralympian

- Curler ♂
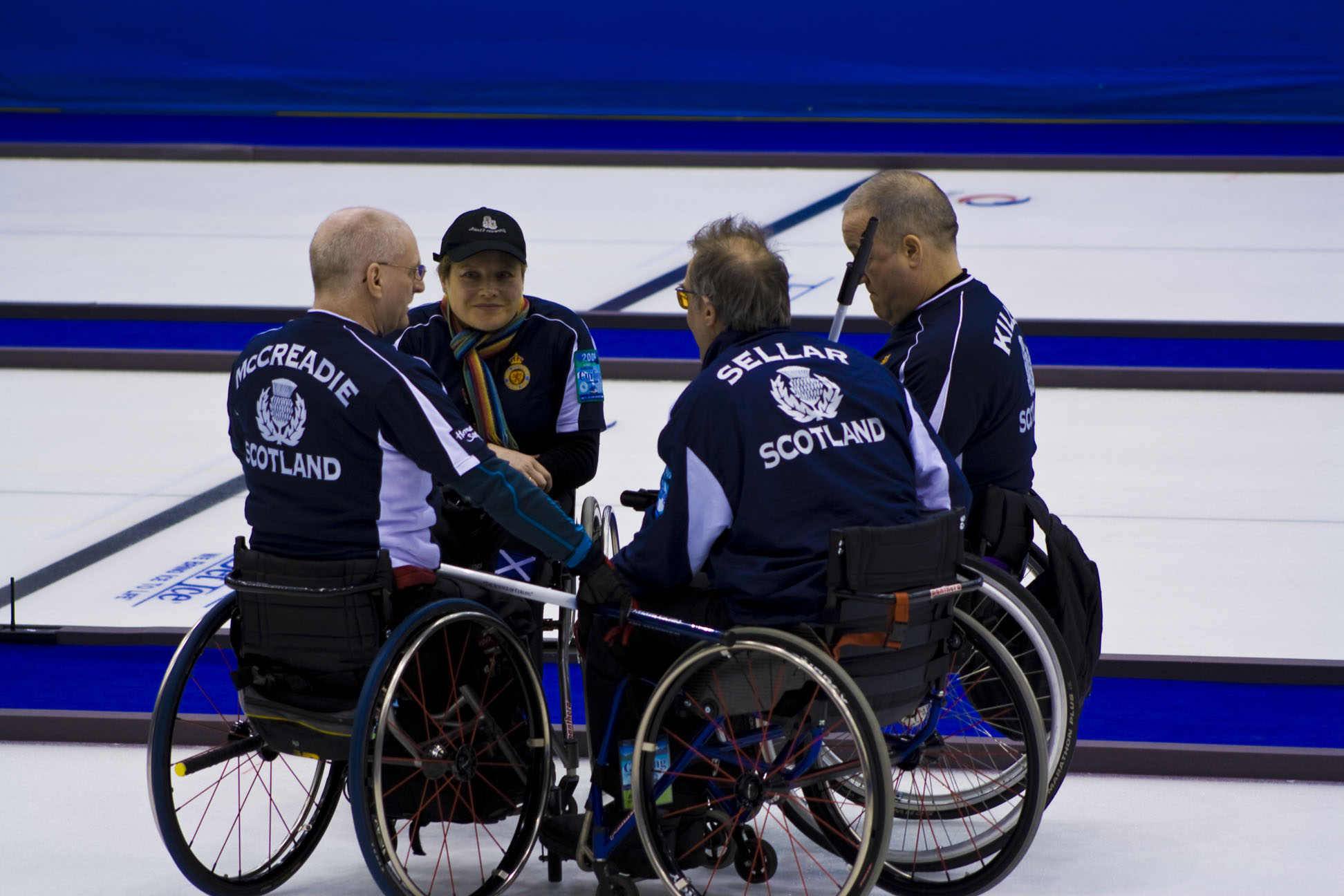
- Born: 5 June 1957 (age 69)

Team
- Curling club: Braehead Wheelchair Curling Club

Curling career
- Member Association: Scotland; United Kingdom
- World Wheelchair Championship: 5 (2002, 2004, 2007, 2008, 2009)
- Paralympic: 1 (2010)
Medal record
Wheelchair curling
World Wheelchair Championship
Gold medal – first place	2004 Sursee
Bronze medal – third place	2002 Sursee
Bronze medal – third place	2007 Sollefteå
Scottish Wheelchair Championship
Gold medal – first place	2006
Gold medal – first place	2010
Gold medal – first place	2015
Gold medal – first place	2016
Gold medal – first place	2017
Gold medal – first place	2018

James "Jim" Sellar (born 5 June 1957) is a Scottish and British wheelchair curler.

At the international level he is a 2004 World champion curler and two-time bronze medallist (2002, 2007). As a member of Great Britain team he participated in the 2010 Winter Paralympics.

At the national level he is a six-time Scottish wheelchair champion curler (2006, 2010, 2015, 2016, 2017, 2018).

He also competes at World level in bowls and coaches in both sports.

== Teams ==
Season	Skip	Third	Second	Lead	Alternate	Coach	Events
2001–02	Frank Duffy	Alex Harvey	Michael McCreadie	Elaine Lister	James Sellar	Jane Sanderson	WWhCC 2002 (bronze)
2003–04	Frank Duffy	Michael McCreadie	Ken Dickson	Angie Malone	James Sellar	Jane Sanderson	WWhCC 2004 (gold)
2005–06	Jim Sellar	Angie Malone	Jim Taylor	Angela Higson			SWhCC 2006 (gold)
2006–07	Michael McCreadie	Aileen Neilson	James Sellar	Angie Malone	James Elliott	Archie Bogie	WWhCC 2007 (bronze)
2007–08	Michael McCreadie	Aileen Neilson	Tom Killin	James Sellar	Rosemary Lenton	Tom Pendreigh	WWhCC 2008 (7th)
2008–09	Michael McCreadie	Aileen Neilson	Tom Killin	James Sellar	Rosemary Lenton	Tom Pendreigh, Sheila Swan	WWhCC 2009 (5th)
2009–10	Aileen Neilson	Michael McCreadie	Tom Killin	Jim Sellar	Angie Malone		SWhCC 2010 (gold)
2009–10	Michael McCreadie	Aileen Neilson	Tom Killin	Angie Malone	Jim Sellar	Tom Pendreigh	WPG 2010 (6th)
2014–15	Gregor Ewan	Jim Gault	Tom Killin	Jim Sellar			SWhCC 2015 (gold)
2015–16	Jim Gault	Tom Killin	Gregor Ewan	Jim Sellar			SWhCC 2016 (gold)
2016–17	Jim Gault	Tom Killin	Debbie McKenna	Jim Sellar			SWhCC 2017 (gold)
2017–18	Jim Gault	Gregor Ewan	Tom Killin	Jim Sellar	Debbie McKenna		SWhCC 2018 (gold)
