= Claes Hultling =

Swedish wheelchair curler and sailor

- Curler ♂
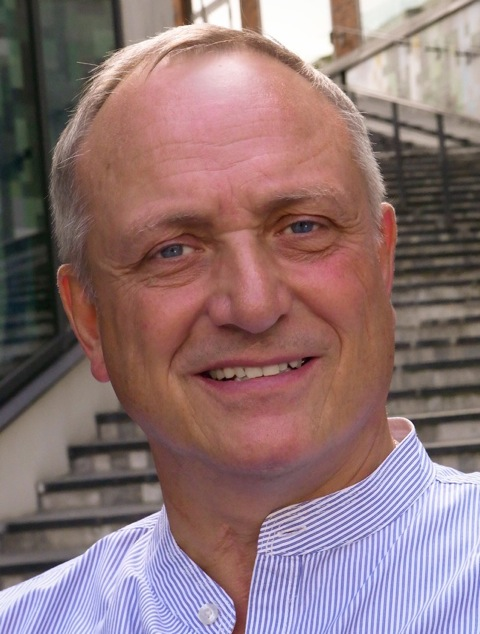
- Born: March 24, 1953 (age 73)

Curling career
- Member Association: Sweden
- World Wheelchair Championship: 1 (2002)
Medal record
Wheelchair curling

Claes Hultling (born March 24, 1953) is a Swedish wheelchair curler and sailor who participated in the 2.4 Metre class event at the 2000 Summer Paralympics and finished 12th.

== Teams ==
Season	Skip	Third	Second	Lead	Alternate	Coach	Events
2001–02	Jalle Jungnell	Glenn Ikonen	Anette Svensson	Bernt Sjöberg	Claes Hultling	Thomas Wilhelm	WWhCC 2002 (4th)
