= 2002 World Wheelchair Curling Championship =

- Host city: Sursee, Switzerland
- Dates: January 21–26
- Winner: Switzerland
- Skip: Urs Bucher
- Third: Cesare Cassani
- Second: Manfred Bolliger
- Lead: Therese Kämpfer
- Alternate: Silvia Obrist
- Finalist: Canada (Chris Daw)

The 2002 World Wheelchair Curling Championship was held from January 21 to 26 in Sursee, Switzerland.

== Teams ==
Bulgaria	Canada	Denmark
Skip: Svetozar Kirov Third: Ivan Shopov; Second: Parakev Arsenov; Lead: Neli Sabeva; Coach: Dimitar Dimitrov	Skip: Chris Daw Third: Don Bell; Second: Jim Primavera; Lead: Karen Blachford; Alternate: Richard Fraser; Coach: Tom Ward	Skip: Preben Nielsen Third: Lars Enemark; Second: Kasper Poulsen; Lead: Rosita Jensen; Alternate: Henrik Petersen; Coach: Finn Mikkelsen
England	Italy	Scotland
Skip: Ian Wakenshaw Third: Noel Thomas; Second: Ken Dickson; Lead: Ewan Park; Coach: Joan Reed	Skip: Andrea Tabanelli Third: Egidio Marchese; Second: Federica Trota; Lead: Fabio Tripodi; Coach: Mauro Maino	Skip: Frank Duffy Third: Alex Harvey; Second: Michael McCreadie; Lead: Elaine Lister; Alternate: James Sellar; Coach: Jane Sanderson
Sweden	Switzerland	United States
Skip: Jalle Jungnell Third: Glenn Ikonen; Second: Anette Svensson; Lead: Bernt Sjöberg; Alternate: Claes Hultling; Coach: Thomas Wilhelm	Skip: Urs Bucher Third: Cesare Cassani; Second: Manfred Bolliger; Lead: Therese Kämpfer; Alternate: Silvia Obrist; Coach: Stephan Rauch	Skip: Doug Sewall Third: Wes Smith; Second: Danelle Libby; Lead: Sam Woodward; Alternate: Mary Dutch; Coach: Jeff Dutch

== Round-robin standings ==
Key
Teams to Playoffs

Country	Skip	W	L
Canada	Chris Daw	7	1
Sweden	Jalle Jungnell	6	2
Switzerland	Urs Bucher	5	3
Scotland	Frank Duffy	5	3
United States	Doug Sewall	4	4
England	Ian Wakenshaw	4	4
Bulgaria	Svetozar Kirov	2	6
Italy	Andrea Tabanelli	2	6
Denmark	Preben Nielsen	1	7

== Round-robin results ==
=== Draw 1 ===
Team	Final
Canada (Daw)	5
Denmark (Nielsen)	4

Team	Final
Switzerland (Bucher)	7
United States (Sewall)	2

Team	Final
England (Wakenshaw)	1
Italy (Tabanelli)	5

Team	Final
Sweden (Jungnell)	4
Scotland (Duffy)	3

=== Draw 2 ===
Team	Final
Bulgaria (Kirov)	1
Switzerland (Bucher)	8

Team	Final
Canada (Daw)	6
Sweden (Jungnell)	3

Team	Final
England (Wakenshaw)	5
Denmark (Nielsen)	2

Team	Final
United States (Sewall)	6
Scotland (Duffy)	7

=== Draw 3 ===
Team	Final
Denmark (Nielsen)	2
Sweden (Jungnell)	4

Team	Final
United States (Sewall)	9
Bulgaria (Kirov)	4

Team	Final
Italy (Tabanelli)	3
Canada (Daw)	4

Team	Final
England (Wakenshaw)	5
Switzerland (Bucher)	3

=== Draw 4 ===
Team	Final
Denmark (Nielsen)	9
United States (Sewall)	2

Team	Final
England (Wakenshaw)	4
Canada (Daw)	6

Team	Final
Scotland (Duffy)	12
Bulgaria (Kirov)	2

Team	Final
Sweden (Jungnell)	8
Italy (Tabanelli)	2

=== Draw 5 ===
Team	Final
England (Wakenshaw)	6
Bulgaria (Kirov)	3

Team	Final
United States (Sewall)	7
Italy (Tabanelli)	4

Team	Final
Denmark (Nielsen)	1
Scotland (Duffy)	14

Team	Final
Switzerland (Bucher)	3
Sweden (Jungnell)	5

=== Draw 6 ===
Team	Final
Canada (Daw)	9
Scotland (Duffy)	5

Team	Final
Italy (Tabanelli)	4
Switzerland (Bucher)	5

Team	Final
United States (Sewall)	8
England (Wakenshaw)	2

Team	Final
Denmark (Nielsen)	6
Bulgaria (Kirov)	7

=== Draw 7 ===
Team	Final
Switzerland (Bucher)	5
Canada (Daw)	6

Team	Final
Sweden (Jungnell)	5
United States (Sewall)	4

Team	Final
Bulgaria (Kirov)	6
Italy (Tabanelli)	3

Team	Final
Scotland (Duffy)	8
England (Wakenshaw)	1

=== Draw 8 ===
Team	Final
Italy (Tabanelli)	6
Scotland (Duffy)	7

Team	Final
Sweden (Jungnell)	5
Bulgaria (Kirov)	3

Team	Final
Denmark (Nielsen)	4
Switzerland (Bucher)	5

Team	Final
Canada (Daw)	4
United States (Sewall)	6

=== Draw 9 ===
Team	Final
Sweden (Jungnell)	4
England (Wakenshaw)	5

Team	Final
Scotland (Duffy)	4
Switzerland (Bucher)	5

Team	Final
Bulgaria (Kirov)	4
Canada (Daw)	6

Team	Final
Italy (Tabanelli)	5
Denmark (Nielsen)	3

== Playoffs ==
Semifinals
1	Canada	8
4	Scotland	2
3	Switzerland	6
2	Sweden	3

Gold Medal Game
1	Canada	6
3	Switzerland	7
Bronze Medal Game
4	Scotland	6
3	Sweden	0

=== Semifinals ===
Team	1	2	3	4	5	6	Final
Canada (Daw) 🔨	3	0	1	0	1	3	8
Scotland (Duffy)	0	1	0	1	0	0	2

Team	1	2	3	4	5	6	Final
Switzerland (Bucher) 🔨	0	1	0	2	0	3	6
Sweden (Jungnell)	1	0	1	0	1	0	3

=== Bronze medal game ===
Team	1	2	3	4	5	6	Final
Scotland (Duffy) 🔨	1	1	2	1	1	0	6
Sweden (Jungnell)	0	0	0	0	0	0	0

=== Gold medal game ===
Team	1	2	3	4	5	6	Final
Canada (Daw)	3	0	2	0	1	0	6
Switzerland (Bucher)	0	3	0	1	0	3	7

2002 World Wheelchair Curling Championship
(Switzerland)
Switzerland
1st title
