= Wes Smith (curler) =

American wheelchair curler and Paralympian

- Curler ♂
- Born: April 10, 1940 (age 86); Medford, Massachusetts, U.S.

Team
- Curling club: Belfast Curling Club, Belfast, Maine

Curling career
- Member Association: United States
- World Wheelchair Championship: 2 (2002, 2004)
- Paralympic: 1 (2006)
Medal record
Wheelchair curling

Wes Smith (born April 10, 1940 in Medford, Massachusetts) is an American wheelchair curler.

He participated in the 2006 Winter Paralympics where American team finished on seventh place.

== Teams ==
Season	Skip	Third	Second	Lead	Alternate	Coach	Events
2001–02	Doug Sewall	Wes Smith	Danelle Libby	Sam Woodward	Mary Dutch	Jeff Dutch	WWhCC 2002 (5th)
2003–04	Doug Sewall	Wes Smith	Sam Woodward	Danelle Libby			USWhCC 2003 (gold)
2003–04	Wes Smith	Mark Taylor	Sam Woodward	Loren Kinney	Danelle Libby	Diane Brown	WWhCC 2004 (5th)
2005–06	James Pierce	Jimmy Joseph	Wes Smith	Danelle Libby	Augusto Perez		WPG 2006 (7th)
