= James Elliott (curler) =

Scottish wheelchair curler

- Curler ♂

Curling career
- Member Association: Scotland
- World Wheelchair Championship: 1 (2007)
Medal record
Wheelchair curling
World Wheelchair Championship
Bronze medal – third place	2007 Sollefteå
Scottish Wheelchair Championship
Gold medal – first place	2007
Gold medal – first place	2009

James "Jim" Elliott is a Scottish wheelchair curler.

At the international level he is a 2007 World bronze medallist.

At the national level he is a two-time Scottish wheelchair champion curler (2007, 2009).

== Teams ==
Season	Skip	Third	Second	Lead	Alternate	Coach	Events
2006–07	Tom Killin	Aileen Neilson	Jim Elliott	Rosemary Lenton			SWhCC 2007 (gold)
2006–07	Michael McCreadie	Aileen Neilson	James Sellar	Angie Malone	James Elliott	Archie Bogie	WWhCC 2007 (bronze)
2008–09	Michael McCreadie	Aileen Neilson	Jim Elliott	Gerald Pocock			SWhCC 2009 (gold)
