= 2007 World Wheelchair Curling Championship =

- Host city: Sollefteå, Sweden
- Arena: Sollefteå Curling Club
- Dates: February 17–24
- Winner: Norway
- Skip: Rune Lorentsen
- Third: Geir Arne Skogstad
- Second: Jostein Stordahl
- Lead: Lene Tystad
- Alternate: Trine Fissum
- Finalist: Switzerland (Manfred Bolliger)

The 2007 World Wheelchair Curling Championship was held from February 17 to 24 at the Sollefteå Curling Club in Sollefteå, Sweden.

== Qualification ==
- Sweden (Host country)
- Top seven finishers from the 2005 World Wheelchair Curling Championship (not including host):
  - Scotland
  - Denmark
  - Switzerland
  - Norway
  - Canada
  - South Korea
  - United States
- Top teams from qualifying event:
  - Russia
  - Japan

=== Qualification event ===
Two teams outside of the top finishers, Russia and Japan, qualified from a qualifying event held in November 2007 in Inverness, Scotland.

== Teams ==
Canada	Denmark	Japan	Norway	Russia
Skip: Chris Daw Third: Gerry Austgarden; Second: Gary Cormack; Lead: Sonja Gaudet; Alternate: Ina Forrest; Coach: Joe Rea	Skip: Kenneth Ørbæk Third: Sussie Pedersen; Second: Jørn Kristensen; Lead: Ingerlise Jensen; Alternate: Bjarne Jensen; Coach: Per Christensen	Skip: Yoji Nakajima Third: Katsuo Ichikawa; Second: Takashi Hidai; Lead: Ayako Saitoh; Alternate: Seiji Uchida; Coach: Kumiko Ogihara	Skip: Rune Lorentsen Third: Geir Arne Skogstad; Second: Jostein Stordahl; Lead: Lene Tystad; Alternate: Trine Fissum; Coach: Thoralf Hognestad	Skip: Nikolay Melnikov Third: Andrey Smirnov; Second: Valeriy Chepilko; Lead: Oxana Slesarenko; Alternate: Victor Ershov; Coach: Oleg Narinyan
Scotland	South Korea	Sweden	Switzerland	United States
Skip: Michael McCreadie Third: Aileen Neilson; Second: James Sellar; Lead: Angie Malone; Alternate: James Elliott; Coach: Archie Bogie	Skip: Kim Hak-sung Third: Kim Myung-jin; Second: Cho Yang-hyun; Lead: Kang Mi-suk; Alternate: Ham Dong-hee; Coach: Kim Chang-gyu	Skip: Roger Westergren Third: Kenneth Nilsson; Second: Gert Erlandsson; Lead: Anna Hammarlind; Alternate: Kristina Ulander; Coach: Mikael Löfvenius	Skip: Manfred Bolliger Third: Erwin Lauper; Second: Cesare Cassani; Lead: Madeleine Wildi; Alternate: Claudia Tosse; Coach: Nadia Röthlisberger-Raspe	Skip: James Pierce Third: Augusto Perez; Second: James Joseph; Lead: Danelle Libby; Alternate: Mark Taylor; Coach: James Griebsch

== Round-robin standings ==
Key
Teams to Playoffs
Teams to Tiebreakers

Country	Skip	W	L
Canada	Chris Daw	6	3
Scotland	Michael McCreadie	6	3
Switzerland	Manfred Bolliger	5	4
Norway	Rune Lorentsen	5	4
Japan	Yoji Nakajima	5	4
United States	James Pierce	5	4
South Korea	Kim Hak-sung	4	5
Russia	Nikolay Melnikov	3	6
Denmark	Kenneth Ørbæk	3	6
Sweden	Roger Westergren	3	6

== Round-robin results ==
=== Draw 1 ===
Saturday, February 17, 13:30

Sheet A	1	2	3	4	5	6	EE	Final
Sweden (Westergren) 🔨	0	0	1	3	1	0	0	5
Japan (Nakajima)	1	3	0	0	0	1	1	6

Sheet B	1	2	3	4	5	6	Final
Russia (Melnikov) 🔨	0	1	1	0	0	1	3
Scotland (McCreadie)	2	0	0	1	1	0	4

Sheet C	1	2	3	4	5	6	Final
Norway (Lorentsen) 🔨	0	3	2	0	1	2	8
United States (Pierce)	3	0	0	3	0	0	6

Sheet D	1	2	3	4	5	6	Final
South Korea (Kim) 🔨	2	1	0	0	3	0	6
Switzerland (Bolliger)	0	0	1	1	0	3	5

=== Draw 2 ===
Saturday, February 17, 19:30

Sheet A	1	2	3	4	5	6	Final
Canada (Daw) 🔨	1	0	0	4	1	1	7
Denmark (Ørbæk)	0	3	1	0	0	0	4

Sheet B	1	2	3	4	5	6	Final
Japan (Nakajima)	0	1	0	1	0	2	4
South Korea (Kim) 🔨	4	0	2	0	2	0	8

Sheet C	1	2	3	4	5	6	Final
Scotland (McCreadie)	0	0	1	0	0	1	2
Switzerland (Bolliger) 🔨	1	2	0	1	1	0	5

Sheet D	1	2	3	4	5	6	Final
United States (Pierce)	0	2	0	1	0	3	6
Sweden (Westergren) 🔨	1	0	3	0	1	0	5

=== Draw 3 ===
Sunday, February 18, 13:30

Sheet A	1	2	3	4	5	6	Final
United States (Pierce) 🔨	0	1	0	2	0	3	6
Russia (Melnikov)	1	0	1	0	3	0	5

Sheet B	1	2	3	4	5	6	Final
Canada (Daw)	1	1	2	0	2	0	6
Norway (Lorentsen) 🔨	0	0	0	1	0	0	1

Sheet C	1	2	3	4	5	6	Final
Sweden (Westergren)	0	0	0	0	2	0	2
South Korea (Kim) 🔨	2	3	1	2	0	1	9

Sheet D	1	2	3	4	5	6	Final
Scotland (McCreadie) 🔨	0	2	3	0	2	0	7
Denmark (Ørbæk)	1	0	0	2	0	1	4

=== Draw 4 ===
Sunday, February 18, 19:30

Sheet A	1	2	3	4	5	6	Final
Switzerland (Bolliger)	4	0	1	0	0	3	8
Canada (Daw) 🔨	0	1	0	4	2	0	7

Sheet B	1	2	3	4	5	6	EE	Final
Scotland (McCreadie)	1	0	1	0	1	0	1	4
Sweden (Westergren) 🔨	0	1	0	1	0	1	0	3

Sheet C	1	2	3	4	5	6	Final
Russia (Melnikov)	2	0	3	4	0	0	9
Denmark (Ørbæk) 🔨	0	3	0	0	1	1	5

Sheet D	1	2	3	4	5	6	Final
Norway (Lorentsen)	1	2	1	1	0	1	6
Japan (Nakajima) 🔨	0	0	0	0	2	0	2

=== Draw 5 ===
Monday, February 19, 13:30

Sheet A	1	2	3	4	5	6	Final
Denmark (Ørbæk) 🔨	3	1	0	0	2	2	8
Switzerland (Bolliger)	0	0	1	4	0	0	5

Sheet B	1	2	3	4	5	6	EE	Final
United States (Pierce)	0	1	0	3	0	0	0	4
Japan (Nakajima) 🔨	1	0	1	0	1	1	3	7

Sheet C	1	2	3	4	5	6	Final
South Korea (Kim)	0	1	1	0	0	0	2
Norway (Lorentsen) 🔨	3	0	0	1	4	2	10

Sheet D	Final
Canada (Daw)	2
Russia (Melnikov) 🔨	9

=== Draw 6 ===
Monday, February 19, 19:30

Sheet A	1	2	3	4	5	6	Final
Scotland (McCreadie) 🔨	1	1	2	0	1	0	5
Norway (Lorentsen)	0	0	0	2	0	1	3

Sheet B	1	2	3	4	5	6	Final
Sweden (Westergren)	2	0	1	1	3	1	8
Switzerland (Bolliger) 🔨	0	2	0	0	0	0	2

Sheet D	1	2	3	4	5	6	Final
Denmark (Ørbæk)	0	0	1	0	1	2	4
United States (Pierce) 🔨	1	1	0	1	0	0	3

=== Draw 7 ===
Tuesday, February 20, 13:30

Sheet B	1	2	3	4	5	6	Final
South Korea (Kim)	2	0	2	0	0	1	5
Canada (Daw) 🔨	0	2	0	3	3	0	8

Sheet C	1	2	3	4	5	6	Final
Switzerland (Bolliger)	1	0	2	1	1	1	6
Japan (Nakajima) 🔨	0	2	0	0	0	0	2

Sheet D	1	2	3	4	5	6	Final
Russia (Melnikov) 🔨	0	2	1	0	3	0	6
Norway (Lorentsen)	1	0	0	3	0	3	7

=== Draw 8 ===
Tuesday, February 20, 19:30

Sheet A	1	2	3	4	5	6	Final
Japan (Nakajima)	1	1	0	1	0	1	4
Canada (Daw) 🔨	0	0	2	0	1	0	3

Sheet B	1	2	3	4	5	6	Final
Scotland (McCreadie)	0	1	1	1	0	X	3
United States (Pierce) 🔨	4	0	0	0	4	X	8

Sheet C	1	2	3	4	5	6	EE	Final
Denmark (Ørbæk)	0	4	0	2	1	0	0	7
Sweden (Westergren) 🔨	3	0	2	0	0	2	4	11

=== Draw 9 ===
Wednesday, February 21, 13:30

Sheet A	1	2	3	4	5	6	Final
Switzerland (Bolliger) 🔨	0	4	0	1	0	0	5
United States (Pierce)	2	0	3	0	3	0	8

Sheet B	1	2	3	4	5	6	Final
Sweden (Westergren)	0	3	1	0	2	0	6
Russia (Melnikov) 🔨	4	0	0	3	0	1	8

Sheet C	1	2	3	4	5	6	Final
South Korea (Kim)	2	1	1	0	0	0	4
Denmark (Ørbæk) 🔨	0	0	0	1	1	3	5

Sheet D	1	2	3	4	5	6	Final
Japan (Nakajima)	0	0	1	2	0	0	3
Scotland (McCreadie) 🔨	2	1	0	0	3	1	7

=== Draw 10 ===
Wednesday, February 21, 19:30

Sheet A	1	2	3	4	5	6	Final
Russia (Melnikov)	1	0	0	0	0	2	3
South Korea (Kim) 🔨	0	1	3	1	2	0	7

Sheet B	1	2	3	4	5	6	Final
Denmark (Ørbæk)	1	0	1	1	0	0	3
Japan (Nakajima) 🔨	0	3	0	0	1	1	5

Sheet C	1	2	3	4	5	6	EE	Final
United States (Pierce) 🔨	1	1	0	1	0	0	0	3
Canada (Daw)	0	0	1	0	1	1	1	4

Sheet D	1	2	3	4	5	6	Final
Switzerland (Bolliger)	1	0	4	0	1	0	6
Norway (Lorentsen) 🔨	0	1	0	1	0	1	3

=== Draw 11 ===
Thursday, February 22, 10:00

Sheet A	1	2	3	4	5	6	Final
South Korea (Kim)	1	0	0	0	0	X	1
Scotland (McCreadie) 🔨	0	2	1	2	2	X	7

Sheet B	1	2	3	4	5	6	EE	Final
Norway (Lorentsen)	0	0	1	1	1	0	1	4
Denmark (Ørbæk) 🔨	1	1	0	0	0	1	0	3

Sheet C	1	2	3	4	5	6	Final
Japan (Nakajima)	1	2	1	0	2	0	6
Russia (Melnikov) 🔨	0	0	0	1	0	3	4

Sheet D	1	2	3	4	5	6	Final
Sweden (Westergren) 🔨	0	0	1	1	0	0	2
Canada (Daw)	1	1	0	0	1	2	5

=== Draw 12 ===
Thursday, February 22, 15:00

Sheet A	1	2	3	4	5	6	Final
Norway (Lorentsen) 🔨	1	0	2	0	0	0	3
Sweden (Westergren)	0	1	0	4	1	2	8

Sheet B	1	2	3	4	5	6	Final
Switzerland (Bolliger) 🔨	0	2	1	0	5	1	8
Russia (Melnikov)	2	0	0	2	0	0	4

Sheet C	1	2	3	4	5	6	Final
Canada (Daw) 🔨	0	2	2	1	1	0	6
Scotland (McCreadie)	3	0	0	0	0	1	3

Sheet D	1	2	3	4	5	6	EE	Final
United States (Pierce)	0	0	2	0	1	1	2	6
South Korea (Kim) 🔨	1	1	0	2	0	0	0	4

== Tiebreakers ==
=== Fourth place classification ===
The winners move on to the playoffs semifinals.

Friday, February 23, 9:00

Sheet A	1	2	3	4	5	6	Final
Switzerland (Bolliger) 🔨	0	2	0	1	2	0	5
United States (Pierce)	2	0	1	0	0	1	4

Sheet C	1	2	3	4	5	6	Final
Japan (Nakajima) 🔨	1	0	1	0	2	0	4
Norway (Lorentsen)	0	3	0	4	0	2	9

=== Eighth place classification ===
Friday, February 23, 9:00

Sheet D	1	2	3	4	5	6	Final
Denmark (Ørbæk) 🔨	3	1	1	0	4	X	9
Sweden (Westergren)	0	0	0	1	0	X	1

Friday, February 23, 19:00

Sheet D	1	2	3	4	5	6	Final
Denmark (Ørbæk)	0	0	0	1	0	1	2
Russia (Melnikov) 🔨	3	1	2	0	1	0	7

== Playoffs ==
Semifinals
1	Scotland	2
4	Switzerland	6
3	Canada	7
2	Norway	8

Gold Medal Game
Switzerland	4
Norway	5
Bronze Medal Game
Scotland	7
Canada	4

=== Semifinal ===
Friday, February 23, 19:00

Sheet C	1	2	3	4	5	6	Final
Scotland (McCreadie)	1	0	0	0	0	1	2
Switzerland (Bolliger) 🔨	0	1	2	1	2	0	6

Sheet A	1	2	3	4	5	6	EE	Final
Canada (Daw) 🔨	0	0	4	0	0	3	0	7
Norway (Lorentsen)	2	1	0	2	2	0	1	8

=== Bronze medal game ===
Saturday, February 24, 10:00

Sheet B	1	2	3	4	5	6	Final
Scotland (McCreadie)	0	0	4	2	0	1	7
Canada (Daw) 🔨	2	1	0	0	1	0	4

=== Gold medal game ===
Saturday, February 24, 14:00

Sheet B	1	2	3	4	5	6	Final
Switzerland (Bolliger) 🔨	1	2	1	0	0	0	4
Norway (Lorentsen)	0	0	0	2	2	1	5

2007 World Wheelchair Curling Championship
(Norway)
Norway
1st title
