= Mary Dutch =

American wheelchair curler

- Curler ♀
- Born: 1944 (age 81–82)

Team
- Curling club: Belfast Curling Club, Belfast, Maine

Curling career
- Member Association: United States
- World Wheelchair Championship: 1 (2002)
Medal record
Wheelchair curling

Mary Dutch is an American wheelchair curler.

== Teams ==
Season	Skip	Third	Second	Lead	Alternate	Coach	Events
2001–02	Doug Sewall	Wes Smith	Danelle Libby	Sam Woodward	Mary Dutch	Jeff Dutch	WWhCC 2002 (5th)
2003–04	Mary Dutch	Loren Kinney	Jim Keith	Bob Prenoveau		Jeff Dutch	USWhCC 2003 (silver)
