= Urs Bucher =

Swiss wheelchair curler and Paralympian

- Curler ♂
- Born: 25 April 1953 (age 73); Lucerne

Curling career
- Member Association: Switzerland
- World Wheelchair Championship: 3 (2002, 2004, 2005)
- Paralympic: 1 (2006)
Medal record
Wheelchair curling
World Wheelchair Championship
Gold medal – first place	2002 Sursee
Silver medal – second place	2004 Sursee
Bronze medal – third place	2005 Glasgow

Urs Bucher (born 25 April 1953 in Lucerne) is a Swiss wheelchair curler.

He participated in 2006 Winter Paralympics where Swiss team finished on sixth place.

== Teams ==
Season	Skip	Third	Second	Lead	Alternate	Coach	Events
2001–02	Urs Bucher	Cesare Cassani	Manfred Bolliger	Therese Kämpfer	Silvia Obrist	Stephan Rauch	WWhCC 2002 (gold)
2003–04	Urs Bucher	Manfred Bolliger	Cesare Cassani	Therese Kämpfer	Otto Erb	Heinz Sommerhalder	WWhCC 2004 (silver)
2004–05	Urs Bucher	Manfred Bolliger	Cesare Cassani	Therese Kämpfer	Erwin Lauper	Urs Keller	WWhCC 2005 (bronze)
2005–06	Urs Bucher	Manfred Bolliger	Cesare Cassani	Madeleine Wildi	Erwin Lauper		WPG 2006 (6th)
