= Claudia Tosse =

Swiss wheelchair curler

- Curler ♀

Curling career
- Member Association: Switzerland
- World Wheelchair Championship: 1 (2007)
Medal record
Wheelchair curling
World Wheelchair Championship
Silver medal – second place	2007 Sollefteå
Swiss Wheelchair Championship
Gold medal – first place	2007 Urdorf

Claudia Tosse is a Swiss wheelchair curler.

At the national level, she is a 2007 Swiss wheelchair champion curler.

At the international level, she is a 2007 World championship silver medallist.

== Teams ==
Season	Skip	Third	Second	Lead	Alternate	Coach	Events
2006–07	Manfred Bolliger	Erwin Lauper	Cesare Cassani	Madeleine Wildi	Claudia Tosse	Nadia Röthlisberger-Raspe (WWhCC)	SWhCC 2007 (gold); WWhCC 2007 (silver)
