= Bruce McAninch =

Canadian wheelchair curler

- Curler ♂
- Born: March 26, 1950 (age 76); Strathroy-Caradoc, Ontario

Curling career
- Member Association: Canada
- World Wheelchair Championship: 2 (2004, 2005)
Medal record
Wheelchair curling
World Wheelchair Curling Championship
Bronze medal – third place	2004 Sursee
Canadian Wheelchair Curling Championship
Gold medal – first place	2004 London
Gold medal – first place	2005 Richmond

Bruce McAninch (born March 26, 1950 in Strathroy-Caradoc, Ontario) is a Canadian wheelchair curler.

== Teams ==
Season	Skip	Third	Second	Lead	Alternate	Coach	Events
2003–04	Chris Daw	Bruce McAninch	Jim Primavera	Karen Blachford		Amy McAninch	CWhCC 2004 (gold); WWhCC 2004 (bronze)
2004–05	Chris Daw	Bruce McAninch	Jim Primavera	Karen Blachford	Gerry Austgarden	Amy Reid, Joe Rea	CWhCC 2005 (gold); WWhCC 2005 (6th)
