= Doug Sewall =

American wheelchair curler

- Curler ♂

Curling career
- Member Association: United States
- World Wheelchair Championship: 1 (2002)
Medal record
Wheelchair curling

Doug Sewall is an American wheelchair curler.

== Teams ==
Season	Skip	Third	Second	Lead	Alternate	Coach	Events
2001–02	Doug Sewall	Wes Smith	Danell Libby	Sam Woodward	Mary Dutch	Jeff Dutch	WWhCC 2002 (5th)
2003–04	Doug Sewall	Wes Smith	Sam Woodward	Danell Libby			USWhCC 2003 (gold)
