= Wheelchair curling at the 2006 Winter Paralympics =

Wheelchair curling at the IX Paralympic Winter Games
- Venue: Pinerolo Palaghiaccio
- Competitors: 8 teams from 8 nations

Medalists
1st place, gold medalist(s)		Canada
2nd place, silver medalist(s)		Great Britain
3rd place, bronze medalist(s)		Sweden

Wheelchair curling at the 2006 Winter Paralympics was played at the Pinerolo Palaghiaccio, in Pinerolo, 30 km southwest of Turin. Wheelchair curling was making its first appearance at the Paralympic Games and took the form of a mixed team event, open to athletes with a physical disability in the lower part of the body that required the everyday use of a wheelchair.

Teams from eight nations, each containing five athletes, entered with four teams advancing from a group stage to a knockout round. Canada won the sport's first Paralympic gold medal beating Great Britain in the final. Sweden won the bronze medal.

== Medalists ==
Event	Gold	Silver	Bronze
Mixed	Canada (CAN); Chris Daw; Gerry Austgarden; Gary Cormack; Sonja Gaudet; Karen Blachford	Great Britain (GBR); Frank Duffy; Michael McCreadie; Tom Killin; Angie Malone; Ken Dickson	Sweden (SWE); Jalle Jungnell; Glenn Ikonen; Rolf Johansson; Anette Wilhelm; Bernt Sjöberg

== Preview ==
Wheelchair curling is played according to the rules of the World Curling Federation, the only modification is that there is no sweeping and stones may be played by hand while leaning over the side of the wheelchair, or pushed by a delivery stick. To be allowed to compete athletes must have a physical disability in the lower part of the body that required the everyday use of a wheelchair. Teams are mixed but must contain at least one member of each sex. Wheelchair curling was first introduced in Switzerland in 2000 and the first World Championships were held in the same country in 2002. It is governed by the World Curling Federation (WCF); as of 2009, 24 of the WCF's member associations were involved in the sport.

This was the first appearance of the sport at the Paralympic Games; the International Paralympic Committee had granted official medal status to mixed gender wheelchair Curling in March 2002. The organising committee of the Turin Games in 2006 agreed to include wheelchair curling in their programme.

The British team, competing as Scotland and made up of Frank Duffy, Ken Dickson, Tom Killin, Angie Malone and Michael McCreadie had won the gold medal at the World Championships in January 2005 in Glasgow; Denmark and Switzerland won the silver and bronze medals. Britain had also won the 2004 World Championships, and were considered favourites for a medal.

== Event summary ==
Eight teams competed and the format was a round-robin tournament; each nation played all others in a group stage with the top four qualifying for medal playoffs. Canada topped the group, Great Britain finished second and Sweden finished third, all three qualifying for the semi-finals. Denmark and Norway finished joint fourth and faced each other in a tie-breaker match to decide who took the final position in the semi-finals; Norway beat Denmark 4–3 to advance.

The semi-finals saw first seeds Canada play Norway and Great Britain face Sweden. Canada beat Norway 5–4 and Great Britain stole three in the 1st end of their game, going on to win 7–3 win. Sweden only managed to curl 35% as a team, with skip Jalle Jungnell struggling at 23% for the game. Sweden and Norway met in the bronze medal match, the Swedes won 10–3.

In the final Great Britain faced Canada. Trailing 6–3 in the final end British skip Frank Duffy had an opportunity with the last stone of the tournament for an open hit of a Canadian stone that would have scored four for Britain and won them the gold medal. He threw too hard and the shot tracked an inch wide allowing Canada to score one and win 7–4.

== Teams ==
The following athletes represented their nations in the 2006 Paralympic wheelchair curling tournament;

Team	Roster					
Team	Skip	Third	Second	Lead	Alternate	Coach
Canada	Chris Daw	Gerry Austgarden	Gary Cormack	Sonja Gaudet	Karen Blachford	Joe Rea
Denmark	Kenneth Ørbæk	Rosita Jensen	Jørn Kristensen	Sussie Pedersen	Bjarne Jensen	
Great Britain	Frank Duffy	Michael McCreadie	Tom Killin	Angie Malone	Ken Dickson	Tom Pendreigh
Italy	Egidio Marchese	Andrea Tabanelli	Pierino Gaspard	Rita Dal Monte	Emanuele Spelorzi	
Norway	Rune Lorentsen	Geir Arne Skogstad	Paul Aksel Johansen	Lene Tystad	Trine Fissum	
Sweden	Jalle Jungnell	Glenn Ikonen	Rolf Johansson	Anette Wilhelm	Bernt Sjöberg	Olle Brudsten, Thomas Wilhelm
Switzerland	Urs Bucher	Manfred Bolliger	Cesare Cassani	Madeleine Wildi	Erwin Lauper	
United States	James Pierce	James Joseph	Wes Smith	Danell Libby	Augusto Perez	

== Round-robin standings ==
Final round-robin standings

Key
Teams to playoffs
Teams to tiebreaker

Country	Skip	W	L	PF	PA
Canada	Chris Daw	5	2	38	29
Great Britain	Frank Duffy	4	3	40	30
Sweden	Jalle Jungnell	4	3	36	34
Denmark	Kenneth Ørbæk	4	3	34	34
Norway	Rune Lorentsen	4	3	44	37
Switzerland	Urs Bucher	3	4	33	32
Italy	Egidio Marchese	2	5	28	43
United States	James Joseph	2	5	25	39

== Round-robin results ==
All times are local (UTC+1).

Summary

Team	Canada	Denmark	Great Britain	Italy	Norway	Sweden	Switzerland	United States	Record
Canada		6–3	7–6	5–3	7–6	4–5	5–1	4–5	5–2
Denmark	3–6		3–5	5–4	7–3	2–10	8–2	6–4	4–3
Great Britain	6–7	5–3		8–5	6–7	7–2	3–4	5–2	4–3
Italy	3–5	4–5	5–8		3–9	7–1	0–14	6–1	2–5
Norway	6–7	3–7	7–6	9–3		4–7	5–4	10–3	4–3
Sweden	5–4	10–2	2–7	1–7	7–4		5–6	6–4	4–3
Switzerland	1–5	2–8	4–3	14–0	4–5	6–5		2–6	3–4
United States	5–4	4–6	2–5	1–6	3–10	4–6	6–2		2–5

Session 1

12 March, 11:00

Draw 1 - Sheet A	1	2	3	4	5	6	Final
Great Britain (Duffy)	1	0	0	0	1	1	3
Switzerland (Bucher) 🔨	0	1	1	2	0	0	4

Draw 1 - Sheet C	1	2	3	4	5	6	Final
Sweden (Jungnell)	1	2	2	0	1	0	6
United States (Joseph) 🔨	0	0	0	2	0	2	4

Draw 1 - Sheet B	1	2	3	4	5	6	Final
Denmark (Ørbæk)	1	0	2	0	0	0	3
Canada (Daw) 🔨	0	1	0	1	3	1	6

Draw 1 - Sheet D	1	2	3	4	5	6	Final
Italy (Marchese)	0	1	0	0	2	0	3
Norway (Lorentsen) 🔨	1	0	3	3	0	2	9

Session 2

12 March, 16:00

Draw 2 - Sheet A	1	2	3	4	5	6	Final
United States (Joseph) 🔨	0	3	0	0	0	0	3
Norway (Lorentsen)	2	0	2	2	2	2	10

Draw 2 - Sheet C	1	2	3	4	5	6	Final
Switzerland (Bucher) 🔨	0	0	0	1	0	0	1
Canada (Daw)	0	1	1	0	1	2	5

Draw 2 - Sheet B	1	2	3	4	5	6	Final
Sweden (Jungnell) 🔨	0	0	1	0	0	0	1
Italy (Marchese)	2	1	0	2	1	1	7

Draw 2 - Sheet D	1	2	3	4	5	6	Final
Great Britain (Duffy) 🔨	3	1	1	0	0	0	5
Denmark (Ørbæk)	0	0	0	1	1	1	3

Session 3

13 March, 11:00

Draw 3 - Sheet A	1	2	3	4	5	6	Final
Sweden (Jungnell)	0	0	0	2	2	1	5
Canada (Daw) 🔨	2	1	1	0	0	0	4

Draw 3 - Sheet C	1	2	3	4	5	6	Final
Italy (Marchese) 🔨	1	1	0	0	0	2	4
Denmark (Ørbæk)	0	0	2	1	2	0	5

Draw 3 - Sheet B	1	2	3	4	5	6	Final
Great Britain (Duffy) 🔨	3	0	1	0	0	2	6
Norway (Lorentsen)	0	4	0	1	2	0	7

Draw 3 - Sheet D	1	2	3	4	5	6	Final
Switzerland (Bucher)	0	0	0	1	0	1	2
United States (Joseph) 🔨	1	1	1	0	3	0	6

Session 4

13 March, 16:00

Draw 4 - Sheet A	1	2	3	4	5	6	Final
Denmark (Ørbæk) 🔨	0	1	2	1	0	2	6
United States (Joseph)	2	0	0	0	2	0	4

Draw 4 - Sheet C	1	2	3	4	5	6	Final
Great Britain (Duffy)	2	1	1	2	0	1	7
Sweden (Jungnell) 🔨	0	0	0	0	2	0	2

Draw 4 - Sheet B	1	2	3	4	5	6	Final
Italy (Marchese)	0	0	0	0	0	0	0
Switzerland (Bucher) 🔨	6	1	1	3	1	2	14

Draw 4 - Sheet D	1	2	3	4	5	6	Final
Norway (Lorentsen) 🔨	0	2	3	0	1	0	6
Canada (Daw)	3	0	0	3	0	1	7

Session 5

14 March, 11:00

Draw 5 - Sheet A	1	2	3	4	5	6	Final
Italy (Marchese) 🔨	3	1	0	0	0	1	5
Great Britain (Duffy)	0	0	5	2	1	0	8

Draw 5 - Sheet C	1	2	3	4	5	6	Final
Denmark (Ørbæk) 🔨	1	0	4	1	1	0	7
Norway (Lorentsen)	0	2	0	0	0	1	3

Draw 5 - Sheet B	1	2	3	4	5	6	Final
Canada (Daw) 🔨	0	1	0	0	2	1	4
United States (Joseph)	1	0	0	4	0	0	5

Draw 5 - Sheet D	1	2	3	4	5	6	Final
Sweden (Jungnell) 🔨	0	1	1	2	1	0	5
Switzerland (Bucher)	2	0	0	0	0	4	6

Session 6

14 March, 16:00

Draw 6 - Sheet A	1	2	3	4	5	6	Final
Switzerland (Bucher) 🔨	0	0	0	1	0	1	2
Denmark (Ørbæk)	1	3	2	0	2	0	8

Draw 6 - Sheet C	1	2	3	4	5	6	EE	Final
Canada (Daw)	0	4	0	1	0	1	1	7
Great Britain (Duffy) 🔨	2	0	1	0	3	0	0	6

Draw 6 - Sheet B	1	2	3	4	5	6	Final
Norway (Lorentsen) 🔨	0	0	0	2	0	2	4
Sweden (Jungnell)	1	2	1	0	3	0	7

Draw 6 - Sheet D	1	2	3	4	5	6	Final
United States (Joseph)	0	0	1	0	0	0	1
Italy (Marchese) 🔨	1	1	0	1	1	2	6

Session 7

15 March, 11:00

Draw 7 - Sheet A	1	2	3	4	5	6	Final
Canada (Daw) 🔨	2	1	1	0	0	1	5
Italy (Marchese)	0	0	0	2	1	0	3

Draw 7 - Sheet C	1	2	3	4	5	6	Final
Norway (Lorentsen) 🔨	2	0	0	1	0	2	5
Switzerland (Bucher)	0	2	1	0	1	0	4

Draw 7 - Sheet B	1	2	3	4	5	6	Final
United States (Joseph) 🔨	0	0	2	0	0	0	2
Great Britain (Duffy)	1	1	0	1	1	1	5

Draw 7 - Sheet D	1	2	3	4	5	6	Final
Denmark (Ørbæk) 🔨	0	0	2	0	0	0	2
Sweden (Jungnell)	1	2	0	5	1	1	10

Tie-breaker

15 March, 16:00

Sheet A	1	2	3	4	5	6	Final
Norway (Lorentsen) 🔨	0	0	1	1	0	2	4
Denmark (Ørbæk)	1	1	0	0	1	0	3

== Medal round ==
Semifinals
2	Great Britain (GBR)	7
3	Sweden (SWE)	3
1	Canada (CAN)	5
4	Norway (NOR)	4

Gold medal game
2	Great Britain (GBR)	4
1	Canada (CAN)	7
Bronze medal game
3	Sweden (SWE)	10
4	Norway (NOR)	2

Semi-finals

17 March, 11:00

Sheet B	1	2	3	4	5	6	Final
Canada (Daw) 🔨	0	1	1	0	2	1	5
Norway (Lorentsen)	1	0	0	3	0	0	4

Sheet D	1	2	3	4	5	6	Final
Great Britain (Duffy)	3	0	1	0	2	1	7
Sweden (Jungnell) 🔨	0	1	0	2	0	0	3

Bronze Medal Game

17 March, 16:00

Sheet C	1	2	3	4	5	6	Final
Sweden (Jungnell) 🔨	2	3	0	0	2	3	10
Norway (Lorentsen)	0	0	1	1	0	0	2

Gold Medal Game

18 March, 11:00

Sheet C	1	2	3	4	5	6	Final
Canada (Daw) 🔨	2	0	1	0	3	1	7
Great Britain (Duffy)	0	3	0	1	0	0	4

== See also ==
- Curling at the 2006 Winter Olympics
