= Elaine Lister =

Scottish wheelchair curler

- Curler ♀

Curling career
- Member Association: Scotland
- World Wheelchair Championship: 1 (2002)
Medal record
Wheelchair curling
World Wheelchair Championship
| Bronze medal – third place | 2002 Sursee |

Elaine Lister is a Scottish wheelchair curler.

At the international level she is a 2002 World championship bronze medallist.

== Teams ==
| Season | Skip | Third | Second | Lead | Alternate | Coach | Events |
|---|---|---|---|---|---|---|---|
| 2001–02 | Frank Duffy | Alex Harvey | Michael McCreadie | Elaine Lister | James Sellar | Jane Sanderson | WWhCC 2002 (bronze) |
