= Ken Dickson =

Scottish and British wheelchair curler and Paralympian

- Curler ♂
- Born: 1 July 1946
- Died: 15 February 2013 (aged 66); Kirkcaldy, Scotland

Curling career
- Member Association: Scotland; United Kingdom
- World Wheelchair Championship: 3 (2002, 2004, 2005)
- Paralympic: 1 (2006)
Medal record
Wheelchair curling
Winter Paralympics
Silver medal – second place	2006 Turin
World Wheelchair Championship
Gold medal – first place	2004 Sursee
Gold medal – first place	2005 Glasgow

Ken Dickson (1 July 1946 – 15 February 2013) was a Scottish and British wheelchair curler.

Ken was one of the stalwarts of wheelchair curling in Scotland and also played a pivotal role in the development of the Borders and Kinross Wheelchair Curling Clubs. Ken was a successful international curler representing both Scotland and Great Britain. He was a two time World Champion in 2004 and 2005 and a 2006 Paralympic silver medalist in Turin.

During the 2002 World Championship he played second for team England, finishing in sixth place.

Dickson died on 15 February 2013 at the Victoria Hospital, Kirkcaldy.

== Teams ==
Season	Skip	Third	Second	Lead	Alternate	Coach	Events
2001–02	Ian Wakenshaw	Noel Thomas	Ken Dickson	Ewan Park		Joan Reed	WWhCC 2002 (6th) (England)
2003–04	Frank Duffy	Michael McCreadie	Ken Dickson	Angie Malone	James Sellar	Jane Sanderson	WWhCC 2004 (gold) (Scotland)
2004–05	Frank Duffy	Ken Dickson	Murray Cran	Margaret Easton			SWhCC 2005 (gold)
2004–05	Frank Duffy	Michael McCreadie	Tom Killin	Angie Malone	Ken Dickson	Jane Sanderson	WWhCC 2005 (gold) (Scotland)
2005–06	Frank Duffy	Michael McCreadie	Tom Killin	Angie Malone	Ken Dickson	Tom Pendreigh	WPG 2006 (silver) (United Kingdom)
