= Alex Harvey (curler) =

Scottish wheelchair curler

- Curler ♂

Curling career
- Member Association: Scotland
- World Wheelchair Championship: 1 (2002)
Medal record
Wheelchair curling
World Wheelchair Championship
Bronze medal – third place	2002 Sursee
Scottish Wheelchair Championship
Gold medal – first place	2003
Gold medal – first place	2014

Alex Harvey is a Scottish wheelchair curler.

At the international level, he is a 2002 World Championship bronze medalist.

At the national level, he is a two-time Scottish wheelchair champion (2003, 2014).

== Teams ==
Season	Skip	Third	Second	Lead	Alternate	Coach	Events
2001–02	Frank Duffy	Alex Harvey	Michael McCreadie	Elaine Lister	James Sellar	Jane Sanderson	WWhCC 2002 (bronze)
2002–03	Alex Harvey	Michael McCreadie	Paul Webster	David Telfer			SWhCC 2003 (gold)
2013–14	Alex Harvey	David Bain	Eddie Flemming	David Telfer			SWhCC 2014 (gold)
