= Madeleine Wildi =

Swiss wheelchair curler and Paralympian

- Curler ♀
- Born: 25 June 1946 (age 80); Olten

Curling career
- Member Association: Switzerland
- World Wheelchair Championship: 2 (2007, 2008)
- Paralympic: 1 (2006)
Medal record
Wheelchair curling
World Wheelchair Championship
Silver medal – second place	2007 Sollefteå

Madeleine Wildi (born 25 June 1946 in Olten) is a Swiss wheelchair curler. She participated in the 2006 Winter Paralympics where the Swiss team finished sixth place.

== Teams ==
Season	Skip	Third	Second	Lead	Alternate	Coach	Events
2005–06	Urs Bucher	Manfred Bolliger	Cesare Cassani	Madeleine Wildi	Erwin Lauper		WPG 2006 (6th)
2006–07	Manfred Bolliger	Erwin Lauper	Cesare Cassani	Madeleine Wildi	Claudia Tosse	Nadia Röthlisberger-Raspe	WWhCC 2007 (silver)
2007–08	Manfred Bolliger	Erwin Lauper	Cesare Cassani	Madeleine Wildi	Therese Kämpfer	Nadia Röthlisberger-Raspe	WWhCC 2008 (8th)
