= Sam Woodward =

American wheelchair curler

- Curler ♂
- Born: December 16, 1944 (age 81)

Team
- Curling club: Belfast Curling Club, Belfast, Maine

Curling career
- Member Association: United States
- World Wheelchair Championship: 2 (2002, 2004)
Medal record
Wheelchair curling

Sam Woodward (born December 16, 1944) is an American wheelchair curler.

== Teams ==
Season	Skip	Third	Second	Lead	Alternate	Coach	Events
2001–02	Doug Sewall	Wes Smith	Danelle Libby	Sam Woodward	Mary Dutch	Jeff Dutch	WWhCC 2002 (5th)
2003–04	Doug Sewall	Wes Smith	Sam Woodward	Danelle Libby			USWhCC 2003 (gold)
2003–04	Wes Smith	Mark Taylor	Sam Woodward	Loren Kinney	Danelle Libby	Diane Brown	WWhCC 2004 (5th)
