= Loren Kinney =

American wheelchair curler

- Curler ♀
- Born: November 8, 1959 (age 67)

Team
- Curling club: Belfast Curling Club, Belfast, Maine

Curling career
- Member Association: United States
- World Wheelchair Championship: 1 (2004)
Medal record
Wheelchair curling

Loren Kinney (born November 8, 1959) is an American wheelchair curler.

== Teams ==
Season	Skip	Third	Second	Lead	Alternate	Coach	Events
2003–04	Mary Dutch	Loren Kinney	Jim Keith	Bob Prenoveau		Jeff Dutch	USWhCC 2003 (silver)
2003–04	Wes Smith	Mark Taylor	Sam Woodward	Loren Kinney	Danelle Libby	Diane Brown	WWhCC 2004 (5th)

== Awards ==
- WWhCC Sportsmanship Award, Women: 2004.
