= Ewan Park =

English wheelchair curler

- Curler ♂

Curling career
- Member Association: England
- World Wheelchair Championship: 1 (2002)
Medal record
Wheelchair curling

Ewan Park is an English wheelchair curler.

== Competitions ==
He competed in the 2002 World Wheelchair Championships.

== Teams ==
| Season | Skip | Third | Second | Lead | Coach | Events |
|---|---|---|---|---|---|---|
| 2001–02 | Ian Wakenshaw | Noel Thomas | Ken Dickson | Ewan Park | Joan Reed | WWhCC 2002 (6th) |
