= Silvia Obrist =

Swiss wheelchair curler

- Curler ♀

Curling career
- Member Association: Switzerland
- World Wheelchair Championship: 1 (2002)
Medal record
Wheelchair curling
World Wheelchair Championship
Gold medal – first place	2002 Sursee

Silvia Obrist is a Swiss wheelchair curler.

== Teams ==
Season	Skip	Third	Second	Lead	Alternate	Coach	Events
2001–02	Urs Bucher	Cesare Cassani	Manfred Bolliger	Therese Kämpfer	Silvia Obrist	Stephan Rauch	WWhCC 2002 (gold)
