= McAninch =

McAninch is a surname. Notable people with the surname include:

- Amy McAninch (born 1975), Canadian curler
- Bruce McAninch (born 1950), Canadian curler

== See also ==
- Cal MacAninch (born 1963), Scottish actor
