= Hultling =

Hultling is a Swedish surname. Notable people with the surname include:

- Claes Hultling (born 1953), Swedish wheelchair curler and sailor
- Katarina Hultling (born 1954), Swedish sports journalist and television presenter
