= Angie Malone =

British wheelchair curler

Angie Malone MBE
- Curler
- Born: 27 May 1965 (age 61); Glasgow, Scotland
Medal record
Wheelchair curling
Representing Great Britain
Paralympic Games
Silver medal – second place	2006 Turin	Mixed competition
Bronze medal – third place	2014 Sochi	Mixed competition
World Championships
Gold medal – first place	2004 Sursee	Mixed competition
Gold medal – first place	2005 Braehead	Mixed competition
Silver medal – second place	2011 Prague	Mixed competition
Bronze medal – third place	2007 Sollefteå	Mixed competition
Bronze medal – third place	2017 Pyeongchang	Mixed competition

Angie Malone MBE (born 27 May 1965) is a British Paralympian and World Champion Wheelchair curler.

== Career ==
In 2005, she represented Scotland at the World Championships on home soil at Braehead. The team successfully defended their title, winning Gold again. All five athletes of the 2005 World Championship team (Angie Malone, Frank Duffy, Ken Dickson, Tom Killin and Michael McCreadie) were selected to compete for Britain in the first Paralympic wheelchair curling event, held at the 2006 Winter Paralympics in Turin, Italy, an event in which the GB team coached by Tom Pendreigh won Silver. In 2007, she was again part of the Scotland team (Michael McCreadie, Aileen Neilson, Jim Sellar, Angie Malone and James Elliot) that won bronze in the World Championships in Solleftea, Sweden.

In 2008, Malone was diagnosed with breast cancer, before operations and treatment she skipped her teams to victory in both Scottish and British Wheelchair Curling Championships. This serious illness and the intensive treatment of it meant she missed the 2008 and 2009 World Championships. In 2009, she was awarded the Scottish Wheelchair Curling Championship sportsmanship award.

With the goal of competing at the Vancouver Paralympic Games 2010, Malone re-entered an exercise regime successfully balancing training with her treatment to ensure she was eligible for selection. In 2010, Malone was again part of Great Britain's Paralympic wheelchair curling team that competed and finished 6th at the Winter Paralympic Games in Vancouver, Canada. The team, also featured Aileen Neilson, Michael McCreadie, Tom Killin and Jim Sellar and was coached by Tom Pendreigh.

In 2011, Malone was again selected as lead player for Scotland at the World Wheelchair Curling Championship in Prague, Czech Republic. The Scotland team coached by Sheila Swan composed of Aileen Neilson, Tom Killin, Gregor Ewan, Angie Malone and Micheal McKenzie reached the final and won silver.

In 2012, she competed in her fifth World Wheelchair Curling Championship, representing Scotland in Chuncheon City, South Korea.

She was part of the British wheelchair curling performance squad coached by Tony Zummack that competed in the 2013 World Wheelchair Curling Championship in Sochi, Russia and the 2014 Paralympic Games in Sochi Russia.

She won a bronze medal at the 2014 Winter Paralympics at Sochi with the British team beating China 7–3 in the third-place play-off match.

She formed part of the Scotland team coached by Shelia Swan that finished second in the World Wheelchair - B Curling Championship 2016 in LOHJA. Allowing the team to qualify for the World Championships.

The same team went on to finish third and win the bronze medal in the World Wheelchair Curling Championship 2017 in PYEONGCHANG Korea

Malone is an accrediting technical coach.

She is a three-time Scottish wheelchair champion curler (2006, 2008, 2010).

== Personal life ==
Malone is a Patron of Ayrshire Sportsability, a charity that through sport supports and inspires young people with a disability.

In November 2015, Malone received the Athletes in Excellence Award from The Foundation for Global Sports Development, in recognition of her community service efforts and work with youth.

On 16 June 2017 Angie Malone was bestowed the honour of an MBE (Member of the Order of the British Empire) for services to wheelchair curling.
