= Tom Killin =

British multi-sport Paralympian (born 1950)

Medal record

Representing Great Britain

Wheelchair fencing

Summer Paralympic Games
Silver medal – second place	1980 Arnhem	Men's team sabre
Silver medal – second place	1980 Arnhem	Men's team foil

Wheelchair curling

Winter Paralympic Games
Silver medal – second place	2006 Turin	Mixed competition

Tom Killin (born 30 March 1950) is a British multi-sport Paralympian. Killin was paralysed following a traffic accident at the age of 17.

Killin was born in Edinburgh. He won two medals in fencing at the 1970 Commonwealth Games. He also represented Scotland and Britain in disability table tennis and basketball for 12 years, including winning a World Championship silver medal in singles table tennis. Killin made his first Paralympic appearance as a wheelchair fencer at the 1980 Summer Games where he won two silver medals, and also competed in the 1984 Summer Paralympics.

He first joined the Braehead Curling Club in 2003. In 2005 he represented Scotland at the World Championships in a team that also contained Frank Duffy, Ken Dickson, Angie Malone and Michael McCreadie. They won the gold medal and all five athletes were selected to compete for Britain in the first Paralympic wheelchair curling event held at the 2006 Winter Paralympics in Turin, Italy.

During the Paralympic tournament Britain won their group games against the teams from Denmark, Sweden, Italy and the United States, and lost the matches against Switzerland, Norway and Canada. Their record of four wins and three losses meant they finished the group stage in second place and advanced to the medal rounds. They beat Sweden in the semifinal and went on to face Canada in the final. Trailing 6–3 in the final, end skip Frank Duffy had an opportunity with the last stone of the tournament for an open hit of a Canadian stone that would have scored four for Britain and won them the gold medal. He threw too hard and the shot tracked an inch wide allowing Canada to score one and win 7–4 leaving Killin and the rest of the British team as silver medalists.

In 2010 Killin was again part of Great Britain's Paralympic wheelchair curling team. The team, which also featured Michael McCreadie as skip, Angela Malone, Aileen Neilson and James Sellar, had finished fifth at the 2009 World Championships. Britain won three of their nine group games, beating teams from Switzerland, Germany, and Japan. They finished in sixth position, which meant that they did not advance to the medal matches.
