= Kim Hak-sung =

South Korean wheelchair curler

Personal information
- Nickname: H-Kim
- Nationality: South Korean
- Born: February 28, 1968 (age 58) Korea

Sport
- Country: South Korea
- Sport: Wheelchair curling

Achievements and titles
- Paralympic finals: 1
- World finals: 2
Medal record
Wheelchair curling
Wheelchair curling at the Winter Paralympics
Silver medal – second place	2010 Vancouver
Wheelchair curling
World Wheelchair Championship
Silver medal – second place	2008 Sursee
Silver medal – second place	2012 Chuncheon

Kim Hak-sung (김학성; born February 28, 1968) is a professional wheelchair curler from South Korea.He lost his function of his lower body due to an industrial hazard while working as a construction worker in 1991. He is the skip for the South Korean team at the 2010 Winter Paralympics. He graduated from Seoul Institute of the Arts. In addition to wheelchair curling, he has represented South Korea in both javelin, discus throw and shot put. His hobbies are internet gaming, fishing, and wheelchair basketball. His home wheelchair curling club is Wonju Yonsei Dream located in Gangwon.
