= Thomas Wilhelm =

Swedish male curler and coach

- Curler ♂
- Born: 16 March 1971 (age 55); Stockholm

Team
- Curling club: Södertälje CK

Curling career
- Member Association: Sweden
Medal record
Curling

Thomas Georg Wilhelm (born 16 March 1971 in Stockholm) is a Swedish curler and curling coach.

== Record as a coach of national teams ==
Year	Tournament, event	National team	Place
2002	2002 World Wheelchair Curling Championship	Sweden (wheelchair)	4
2004	2004 World Wheelchair Curling Championship	Sweden (wheelchair)	7
2005	2005 World Wheelchair Curling Championship	Sweden (wheelchair)	4
2006	2006 Winter Paralympics	Sweden (wheelchair)	3rd place, bronze medalist(s)
2009	2009 World Wheelchair Curling Championship	Sweden (wheelchair)	2nd place, silver medalist(s)

== Private life ==
He is married to fellow wheelchair curler Anette Wilhelm, two-time Paralympic bronze medallist.
