= Sonja Gaudet =

Canadian wheelchair curler

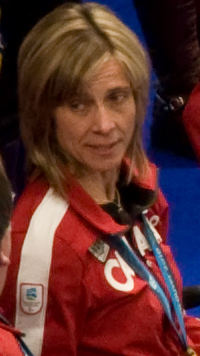

Personal information
- Nationality: Canadian
- Citizenship: Canada
- Born: July 22, 1966 (age 60) North Vancouver, British Columbia
Medal record
Wheelchair curling
Representing Canada
Paralympic Games
Gold medal – first place	2006 Pinerolo	Mixed team
Gold medal – first place	2010 Vancouver	Mixed team
Gold medal – first place	2014 Sochi	Mixed team

Sonja Gaudet (born July 22, 1966, in North Vancouver, British Columbia) is a Canadian wheelchair curler from Vernon, British Columbia. She was on the team that won gold in wheelchair curling at the 2006 Winter Paralympics, the 2010 Winter Paralympics and the 2014 Winter Paralympics. She was also the Canadian flag bearer for the 2014 Winter Paralympics. She currently resides in Vernon.

Gaudet was awarded the Order of Sport in 2020, marking her induction into Canada's Sports Hall of Fame. She was the first wheelchair curler inducted into Canada's Sports Hall of Fame. In 2024, she was inducted into the World Curling Hall of Fame.

== Results ==
Paralympic Games
Finish	Event	Year	Place
Gold	Wheelchair Curling	2006	Turin, Italy
Gold	Wheelchair Curling	2010	Vancouver, Canada
Gold	Wheelchair Curling	2014	Sochi, Russia
World Wheelchair Curling Championships
Finish	Event	Year	Place
4.	Wheelchair Curling	2007	Sollefteå, Sweden
4.	Wheelchair Curling	2008	Sursee, Switzerland
Gold	Wheelchair Curling	2011	Prague, Czech Republic
