= Amy McAninch =

Canadian curler and coach

- Curler ♀
- Born: June 24, 1975 (age 51)

Curling career
- Member Association: Canada
Medal record
Curling

Amy McAninch (born June 24, 1975) is a Canadian female curler and curling coach.

== Record as a coach of national teams ==
Year	Tournament, event	National team	Place
2004	2004 World Wheelchair Curling Championship	Canada (wheelchair)	3rd place, bronze medalist(s)
