= Anette Wilhelm =

Swedish wheelchair curler

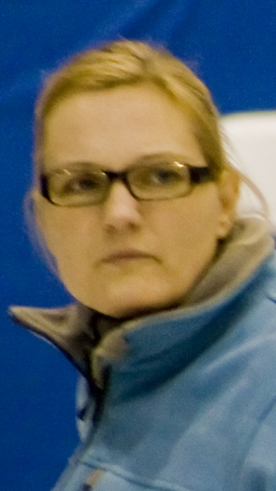

Personal information
- Nationality: Swedish
- Citizenship: Sweden
- Born: Anette Svensson; 22 March 1972 (age 54)

Sport
- Country: Sweden
- Sport: Wheelchair curling
Medal record
Wheelchair curling
Representing Sweden
Winter Paralympics
Bronze medal – third place	2006 Turin	Wheelchair curling - Mixed
Bronze medal – third place	2010 Vancouver	Wheelchair curling - Mixed

Anette Wilhelm (born Anette Svensson on 22 March 1972) is a Swedish wheelchair curler. She was on the bronze winning Swedish team at Wheelchair curling at the 2006 Winter Paralympics. She was also on the silver medal-winning Swedish team at the 2009 world championship.

== Results ==
Paralympic Games
Finish	Event	Year	Place
Bronze	Wheelchair curling	2006	Turin, Italy
Bronze	Wheelchair curling	2010	Vancouver, Canada
Wheelchair curling World Championships
Finish	Event	Year	Place
4.	Wheelchair curling	2002	Sursee, Switzerland
7.	Wheelchair curling	2004	Sursee, Switzerland
4.	Wheelchair curling	2005	Glasgow, Scotland
Silver	Wheelchair curling	2009	Vancouver, Canada

== Personal life ==
Wilhelm was paralyzed in a car accident in 1986.

Beyond her athletic pursuits, Wilhelm has worked as an accountant in a spinal injuries clinic.

Wilhelm married fellow curling coach Thomas Wilhelm. Wilhelm has two children.
