= Tom Ward (curler) =

Canadian male curler and coach

- Curler ♂

Curling career
- Member Association: Canada
Medal record
Curling

Tom Ward is a Canadian male curler and coach.

== Record as a coach of national teams ==
Year	Tournament, event	National team	Place
2002	2002 World Wheelchair Curling Championship	Canada (wheelchair)	2nd place, silver medalist(s)
