= Augusto Perez =

Spanish American wheelchair curler

Personal information
- Full name: Augusto J. Perez
- Nationality: American
- Born: November 9, 1972 (age 53) Madrid, Spain

Sport
- Country: United States
- Sport: Wheelchair curling

Augusto J. "Goose" Perez (born November 9, 1972) is a Spanish American retired wheelchair curler. He was the 2008 USA Curling Male Athlete of the Year and was on the bronze medal team at the 2008 World Wheelchair Curling Championships. He graduated from Le Moyne College. In addition to curling he has also competed in kayak and canoe. He was selected to be skip of the United States team at the 2010 Winter Paralympics.

In 2009, he was inducted into the International Canoe Hall of Fame.
