= Glenn Ikonen =

Swedish wheelchair curler

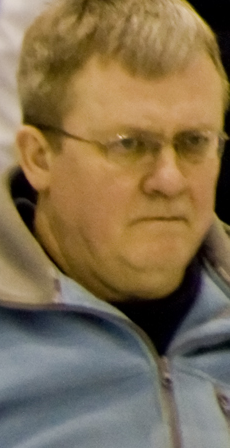
Glenn Ikonen

Glenn Ikonen (born 29 April 1955) is a Swedish Paralympic wheelchair curler. He was on the bronze medal-winning Swedish team at the 2006 Winter Paralympics and competed at the 2010 Winter Paralympics, where he was suspended for six months for use of an illegal drug, a blood pressure medicine he had taken for 4–5 years, prescribed by his doctor. He moved to Sweden from Finland in 1979.

== Results ==
Paralympic Games
Finish	Event	Year	Place
Bronze	Wheelchair curling	2006	Turin, Italy
Bronze	Wheelchair Curling suspended	2010	Vancouver, Canada
Wheelchair curling World Championships
Finish	Event	Year	Place
4.	Wheelchair curling	2002	Sursee, Switzerland
7.	Wheelchair curling	2004	Sursee, Switzerland
4.	Wheelchair curling	2005	Glasgow, Scotland
10.	Wheelchair curling	2007	Sollefteå, Sweden
6.	Wheelchair curling	2008	Sursee, Switzerland
Silver	Wheelchair curling	2009	Vancouver, Canada
