= Heinz Sommerhalder =

Swiss male curler and coach

- Curler ♂

Curling career
- Member Association: Switzerland
Medal record
Curling

Heinz Sommerhalder is a Swiss male curler and coach.

== Record as a coach of national teams ==
Year	Tournament, event	National team	Place
1998	1998 World Women's Curling Championship	Switzerland (women)	6
2004	2004 World Wheelchair Curling Championship	Switzerland (wheelchair)	2nd place, silver medalist(s)
