= Jeff Dutch =

American curler and coach

- Curler ♂

Team
- Curling club: Belfast Curling Club, Belfast, Maine

Curling career
- Member Association: United States
Medal record
Wheelchair curling

Jeff Dutch is an American curler and curling coach.

== Record as a coach of national teams ==
Year	Tournament, event	National team	Place
2002	2002 World Wheelchair Curling Championship	United States (wheelchair)	5
