= Erwin Lauper =

Swiss wheelchair curler (born 1946)

- Curler ♂
- Born: 14 June 1946 (age 80)

Curling career
- Member Association: Switzerland
- World Wheelchair Championship: 3 (2005, 2007, 2008)
- Paralympic: 1 (2006)
Medal record
Wheelchair curling
World Wheelchair Championship
Bronze medal – third place	2005 Glasgow
Silver medal – second place	2007 Sollefteå

Erwin Lauper (born 14 June 1946, in Bern) is a Swiss wheelchair curler. He represents Bern CC, and began wheelchair curling in 1981.

He has competed at all World Championships since his first in 2005, winning two medals and finishing eighth in 2008; he was also part of the Swiss team which finished sixth at the 2006 Paralympics.

Nationally, he won gold at the Swiss Championships in 2005, bronze in 2006, and gold in 2007.
