= World Wheelchair Curling Championship =

International wheelchair curling event

- Established: 2002
- 2027 host city: Lohja, Finland
- 2027 arena: Kisakallio Sports Institute
- 2025 champion: China

Current edition
- 2027 World Wheelchair Curling Championship

The World Wheelchair Curling Championship is an annual world championship held to determine the world's best team in wheelchair curling. It is held every non-Paralympic year.

== Medalists ==
Following is a list of medalists:

Year	Location	Gold	Silver	Bronze
2002	(Switzerland) Sursee	Switzerland; Urs Bucher; Cesare Cassani; Manfred Bolliger; Therese Kämpfer; Silvia Obrist	Canada; Chris Daw; Don Bell; Jim Primavera; Karen Blachford; Richard Fraser	Scotland; Frank Duffy; Alex Harvey; Michael McCreadie; Elaine Lister; James Sellar
2004	(Switzerland) Sursee	Scotland; Frank Duffy; Michael McCreadie; Ken Dickson; Angie Malone; James Sellar	Switzerland; Urs Bucher; Manfred Bolliger; Cesare Cassani; Therese Kämpfer; Otto Erb	Canada; Chris Daw; Bruce McAninch; Jim Primavera; Karen Blachford
2005	(Scotland) Braehead	Scotland; Frank Duffy; Michael McCreadie; Tom Killin; Angie Malone; Ken Dickson	Denmark; Kenneth Ørbæk; Rosita Jensen; Jørn Kristensen; Bjarne Jensen; Sussie Pedersen	Switzerland; Urs Bucher; Manfred Bolliger; Cesare Cassani; Therese Kämpfer; Erwin Lauper
2007	(Sweden) Sollefteå	Norway; Rune Lorentsen; Geir Arne Skogstad; Jostein Stordahl; Lene Tystad; Trine Fissum	Switzerland; Manfred Bolliger; Erwin Lauper; Cesare Cassani; Madeleine Wildi; Claudia Tosse	Scotland; Michael McCreadie; Aileen Neilson; James Sellar; Angie Malone; James Elliott
2008	(Switzerland) Sursee	Norway; Rune Lorentsen; Jostein Stordahl; Geir Arne Skogstad; Lene Tystad; Anne Mette Samdal	South Korea; Kim Hak-sung; Kim Myung-jin; Cho Yang-hyun; Kang Mi-suk; Ham Dong-hee	United States; James Pierce; Augusto Perez; James Joseph; Jacqueline Kapinowski; Bob Prenoveau
2009	(Canada) Vancouver	Canada; Jim Armstrong; Darryl Neighbour; Ina Forrest; Chris Sobkowicz; Sonja Gaudet	Sweden; Jalle Jungnell; Glenn Ikonen; Patrik Burman; Anette Wilhelm	Germany; Jens Jäger; Marcus Sieger; Jens Gäbel; Caren Totzauer; Astrid Hoer
2011	(Czech Republic) Prague	Canada; Jim Armstrong; Darryl Neighbour; Ina Forrest; Sonja Gaudet; Bruno Yizek	Scotland; Aileen Neilson; Tom Killin; Gregor Ewan; Angie Malone; Michael McKenzie	Norway; Rune Lorentsen; Jostein Stordahl; Tone Edvardsen; Terje Rafdal; Runar Bjørnstad
2012	(South Korea) Chuncheon	Russia; Andrey Smirnov; Marat Romanov; Aleksandr Shevchenko; Svetlana Pakhomova; Oxana Slesarenko	South Korea; Kim Hak-sung; Jung Seung-won; Noh Byeong-il; Kang Mi-suk; Bang Min-ja	China; Wang Haitao; Liu Wei; He Jun; Xu Guangqin; Zhang Qiang
2013	(Russia) Sochi	Canada; Jim Armstrong; Dennis Thiessen; Ina Forrest; Sonja Gaudet; Mark Ideson	Sweden; Jalle Jungnell; Glenn Ikonen; Patrik Kallin; Kristina Ulander; Gert Erlandsson	China; Wang Haitao; Liu Wei; Xu Guangqin; He Jun; Zhang Qiang
2015	(Finland) Lohja	Russia; Andrey Smirnov; Marat Romanov; Oxana Slesarenko; Alexander Shevchenko; Svetlana Pakhomova	China; Wang Haitao; Liu Wei; Zhang Qiang; Xu Guangqin; He Jun	Finland; Markku Karjalainen; Sari Karjalainen; Mina Mojtahedi; Tuomo Aarnikka; Vesa Leppänen
2016	(Switzerland) Lucerne	Russia; Andrey Smirnov; Konstantin Kurokhtin; Svetlana Pakhomova; Alexander Shevchenko; Marat Romanov	Norway; Rune Lorentsen; Jostein Stordahl; Ole Fredrik Syversen; Sissel Løchen; Jan-Erik Hansen	South Korea; Yang Hui-tae; Jung Seung-won; Seo Soon-seok; Bang Min-ja; Cha Jae-goan
2017	(South Korea) Gangneung	Norway; Rune Lorentsen; Jostein Stordahl; Ole Fredrik Syversen; Sissel Løchen; Rikke Iversen	Russia; Andrey Smirnov; Konstantin Kurokhtin; Alexander Shevchenko; Daria Shchukina; Marat Romanov	Scotland; Aileen Neilson; Gregor Ewan; Hugh Nibloe; Bob McPherson; Angie Malone
2019	(Scotland) Stirling	China; Wang Haitao; Zhang Mingliang; Xu Xinchen; Yan Zhou; Zhang Qiang	Scotland; Aileen Neilson; Hugh Nibloe; Bob McPherson; David Melrose; Gary Logan	South Korea; Yang Hui-tae (Fourth); Seo Soon-seok; Cha Jin-ho (Skip); Bang Min-ah; Min Byeong-seok
2020	(Switzerland) Wetzikon	Russia; Konstantin Kurokhtin; Andrei Meshcheriakov; Vitaly Danilov; Daria Shchukina; Anna Karpushina	Canada; Jon Thurston (Fourth); Ina Forrest; Dennis Thiessen; Mark Ideson (Skip); Collinda Joseph	Sweden; Viljo Petersson-Dahl; Mats-Ola Engborg; Ronny Persson; Kristina Ulander; Zandra Reppe
2021	(China) Beijing	China; Wang Haitao; Chen Jianxin; Zhang Mingliang; Yan Zhuo; Sun Yulong	Sweden; Viljo Petersson-Dahl; Ronny Persson; Mats-Ola Engborg; Kristina Ulander; Sabina Johansson	RCF; Konstantin Kurokhtin; Andrei Meshcheriakov; Vitaly Danilov; Daria Shchukina; Olga Beliak
2023	(Canada) Richmond	China; Wang Haitao; Zhang Shuaiyu; Yang Jinqiao; Li Nana; Zhang Mingliang	Canada; Jon Thurston (Fourth); Ina Forrest; Gil Dash; Mark Ideson (Skip); Marie Wright	Scotland; Gregor Ewan (Fourth); Hugh Nibloe (Skip); Gary Logan; Joanna Butterfield; Meggan Dawson-Farrell
2024	(South Korea) Gangneung	Norway; Jostein Stordahl; Ole Fredrik Syversen; Geir Arne Skogstad; Mia Larsen Sveberg; Ingrid Djupskås	Canada; Jon Thurston (Fourth); Ina Forrest; Gil Dash; Mark Ideson (Skip); Chrissy Molnar	China; Wang Haitao; Zhang Shuaiyu; Zhang Qiang; Yan Zhuo; Peng Bing
2025	(Scotland) Stevenston	China; Wang Haitao; Chen Jianxin; Zhang Mingliang; Li Nana; Zhang Qiang	South Korea; Lee Hyeon-chul; Nam Bong-kwang; Yang Hui-tae; Yun Hee-keong; Cha Jin-ho	Canada; Jon Thurston (Fourth); Gil Dash (Skip); Doug Dean; Collinda Joseph; Chrissy Molnar
2027	(Finland) Lohja			

== All-time medal table ==
As of 2025 World Wheelchair Curling Championship

Rank	Nation	Gold	Silver	Bronze	Total
1	China	4	1	3	8
2	Norway	4	1	1	6
2	Russia	4	1	1	6
4	Canada	3	4	2	9
5	Scotland	2	2	4	8
6	Switzerland	1	2	1	4
7	South Korea	0	3	2	5
8	Sweden	0	3	1	4
9	Denmark	0	1	0	1
10	Finland	0	0	1	1
10	Germany	0	0	1	1
10	United States	0	0	1	1
Totals (12 entries)		18	18	18	54

== Performance timeline ==
Country	2000s						2010s							2020s						Years
Country	02	04	05	07	08	09	11	12	13	15	16	17	19	20	21	23	24	25	27	Years
Bulgaria	7	10	12																	3
Canada	2nd place, silver medalist(s)	3rd place, bronze medalist(s)	6	4	4	1st place, gold medalist(s)	1st place, gold medalist(s)	6	1st place, gold medalist(s)	6	7	5	10	2nd place, silver medalist(s)	5	2nd place, silver medalist(s)	2nd place, silver medalist(s)	3rd place, bronze medalist(s)	Q	19
China						5	5	3rd place, bronze medalist(s)	3rd place, bronze medalist(s)	2nd place, silver medalist(s)	5	4	1st place, gold medalist(s)	4	1st place, gold medalist(s)	1st place, gold medalist(s)	3rd place, bronze medalist(s)	1st place, gold medalist(s)	Q	14
Czech Republic							10							12		8	11			4
Denmark	9	8	2nd place, silver medalist(s)	9												11				5
England	6	4	10															8	Q	5
Estonia													8	10			12			3
Finland									7	3rd place, bronze medalist(s)	10	10							Q	5
Germany			13			3rd place, bronze medalist(s)	9			7	8	9	12							7
Italy	8	6	9		5	6		10							11	10	8	10		10
Japan			13	5	9											12		9		5
Latvia													9	7	8	9	5	12		6
Norway		12	5	1st place, gold medalist(s)	1st place, gold medalist(s)	8	3rd place, bronze medalist(s)	9	9	10	2nd place, silver medalist(s)	1st place, gold medalist(s)	4	5	7	7	1st place, gold medalist(s)	6	Q	18
Poland			15																	1
Russia		9	15	8	10		4	1st place, gold medalist(s)	5	1st place, gold medalist(s)	1st place, gold medalist(s)	2nd place, silver medalist(s)	7	1st place, gold medalist(s)	3rd place, bronze medalist(s)					13
Scotland	3rd place, bronze medalist(s)	1st place, gold medalist(s)	1st place, gold medalist(s)	3rd place, bronze medalist(s)	7	9	2nd place, silver medalist(s)	7	6	8		3rd place, bronze medalist(s)	2nd place, silver medalist(s)	9	6	3rd place, bronze medalist(s)	10	7	Q	18
Slovakia								4	8	4	9		6	8	10		7	4	Q	10
South Korea		11	7	7	2nd place, silver medalist(s)	7	6	2nd place, silver medalist(s)	10		3rd place, bronze medalist(s)	6	3rd place, bronze medalist(s)	6	9	5	6	2nd place, silver medalist(s)	Q	17
Sweden	4	7	4	10	6	2nd place, silver medalist(s)	8	8	2nd place, silver medalist(s)	9				3rd place, bronze medalist(s)	2nd place, silver medalist(s)	4	4	5	Q	16
Switzerland	1st place, gold medalist(s)	2nd place, silver medalist(s)	3rd place, bronze medalist(s)	2nd place, silver medalist(s)	8	10					4	8	5	11	12					11
United States	5	5	8	6	3rd place, bronze medalist(s)	4	7	5	4	5	6	7	11		4	6	9	11		17
Wales		13	11																	2

== Records ==
Most championship titles
Gender	Curler	Country	No.	Years
Male	Jostein Stordahl	Norway	4	2007–2008, 2017, 2024
Male	Wang Haitao	China	4	2019, 2021, 2023, 2025
Male	Zhang Mingliang	China	4	2019, 2021, 2023, 2025
Female	Ina Forrest	Canada	3	2009, 2011, 2013
Female	Sonja Gaudet	Canada	3	2009, 2011, 2013
Female	Svetlana Pakhomova	Russia	3	2012, 2015, 2016

Most championship finals
Gender	Curler	Country	No.	Years
Male	Jostein Stordahl	Norway	5	2007–2008, 2011, 2017, 2024
Male	Wang Haitao	China	5	2015, 2019, 2021, 2023, 2025
Female	Ina Forrest	Canada	6	2009, 2011, 2013, 2020, 2023–2024

Most championship medals
Gender	Curler	Country	No.	Years
Male	Wang Haitao	China	8	2012–2013, 2015, 2019, 2021, 2023–2025
Female	Ina Forrest	Canada	6	2009, 2011, 2013, 2020, 2023–2024

Most championship appearances
Gender	Curler	Country	No.	Years
Male	Jostein Stordahl	Norway	15	2007–2009, 2011–2013, 2015–2017, 2019–2021, 2023–2025
Female	Ina Forrest	Canada	14	2007–2009, 2011–2013, 2015–2017, 2019–2021, 2023–2024

Most titles at back-to-back events
Gender	Curler	Country	No.	Period
Male	Frank Duffy	Scotland	2	2004–2005
Male	Michael McCreadie	Scotland	2	2004–2005
Male	Ken Dickson	Scotland	2	2004–2005
Male	Rune Lorentsen	Norway	2	2007–2008
Male	Jostein Stordahl	Norway	2	2007–2008
Male	Geir Arne Skogstad	Norway	2	2007–2008
Male	Jim Armstrong	Canada	2	2009–2011
Male	Darryl Neighbour	Canada	2	2009–2011
Male	Andrey Smirnov	Russia	2	2015–2016
Male	Alexander Shevchenko	Russia	2	2015–2016
Male	Marat Romanov	Russia	2	2015–2016
Male	Wang Haitao	China	2	2021–2023
Male	Zhang Mingliang	China	2	2021–2023
Female	Angie Malone	Scotland	2	2004–2005
Female	Lene Tystad	Norway	2	2007–2008
Female	Ina Forrest	Canada	2	2009–2011
Female	Sonja Gaudet	Canada	2	2009–2011
Female	Svetlana Pakhomova	Russia	2	2015–2016

Most finals at back-to-back events
Gender	Curler	Country	No.	Period
Male	Andrey Smirnov	Russia	3	2015–2017
Male	Alexander Shevchenko	Russia	3	2015–2017
Male	Marat Romanov	Russia	3	2015–2017
Female	Therese Kämpfer	Switzerland	2	2002–2004
Female	Angie Malone	Scotland	2	2004–2005
Female	Lene Tystad	Norway	2	2007–2008
Female	Ina Forrest	Canada	2	2009–2011, 2023–2024
Female	Sonja Gaudet	Canada	2	2009–2011
Female	Svetlana Pakhomova	Russia	2	2015–2016
Female	Sissel Løchen	Norway	2	2016–2017

Most medals at back-to-back events
Gender	Curler	Country	No.	Period
Male	Manfred Bolliger	Switzerland	4	2002–2007
Male	Cesare Cassani	Switzerland	4	2002–2007
Male	Michael McCreadie	Scotland	4	2002–2007
Male	Wang Haitao	China	4	2021–2025
Female	Therese Kämpfer	Switzerland	3	2002–2005
Female	Angie Malone	Scotland	3	2004–2007
Female	Xu Guangqin	China	3	2012–2015

Most appearances at back-to-back events
Gender	Curler	Country	No.	Period
Male	Jostein Stordahl	Norway	15	2007–2025
Female	Ina Forrest	Canada	14	2007–2024

Teams went undefeated in championship
Year	Country	Skip	Games played
2004	Scotland	Frank Duffy	8
2005	Scotland	Frank Duffy	9
2011	Canada	Jim Armstrong	11

== Wheelchair Fair Play Award ==
For the World Curling Wheelchair Sportsmanship Award all participants are invited to nominate a fellow competitor who, in their view, has best exemplified the traditional values of skill, honesty, fair play, sportsmanship and friendship during a world championship. The award is presented at the closing ceremony. Players cannot vote for a fellow team member.

Year	Curler	Country
2002	Frank Duffy	Scotland
2004	Loren Kinney	United States
2005	Jalle Jungnell	Sweden
2007	Augusto J. Perez	United States
2008	Gabriele Dallapiccola	Italy
2009	Anette Wilhelm	Sweden
2011	Aileen Neilson	Scotland
2012	Kim Hak-sung	South Korea
2013	Jalle Jungnell	Sweden
2015	Mina Mojtahedi	Finland
2016	Christiane Putzich	Germany
2017	Konstantin Kurokhtin	Russia
2019	Rune Lorentsen	Norway
2020	Radek Musílek	Czech Republic
2021	Ole Fredrik Syversen	Norway
2023	Stephen Emt	United States
2024	Katlin Riidebach	Estonia
2025	Stewart Pimblett	England
2027		

== World Wheelchair-B Curling Championship ==
The World Wheelchair-B Curling Championship is a qualifier event for the World Wheelchair Championship. From 2015 to 2018, the top 2 teams qualify for the World Championship. Starting at the 2018 World Wheelchair-B Curling Championship, the top 3 teams qualify.

=== Medallists ===
Following is a list of medallists for the World Wheelchair-B Championship:

Year	Location	Gold	Silver	Bronze
2015	(Finland) Lohja	Norway; Rune Lorentsen; Jostein Stordahl; Ole Fredrik Syversen; Sissel Løchen; Gina Kristin Brøndbo	South Korea; Yang Hui-tae; Cha Jae-goan; Seo Soon-seok; Bang Min-ja; Jung Seung-won	Sweden; Patrik Kallin; Kicki Ulander; Ronny Persson; Zandra Reppe; Gert Erlandsson
2016	(Finland) Lohja	Finland; Markku Karjalainen; Yrjö Jääskeläinen; Sari Karjalainen; Vesa Leppänen; Riitta Särösalo	Scotland; Aileen Neilson; Gregor Ewan; Hugh Nibloe; Bob McPherson; Angie Malone	Slovakia; Radoslav Ďuriš; Dušan Pitoňák; Peter Zaťko; Monika Kunkelová; Imrich Lyócsa
2018	(Finland) Lohja	Estonia; Andrei Koitmäe; Viljar Villiste; Ain Villau; Signe Falkenberg; Mait Mätas	Slovakia; Radoslav Ďuriš; Dušan Pitoňák; Imrich Lyócsa; Monika Kunkelová; Peter Zaťko	Latvia; Poļina Rožkova; Sergeys Djacenko; Agris Lasmans; Ojars Briedis
2019	(Finland) Lohja	Canada; Jon Thurston; Ina Forrest; Marie Wright; Mark Ideson; Dennis Thiessen	Sweden; Viljo Petersson-Dahl; Mats-Ola Engborg; Ronny Persson; Kristina Ulander; Zandra Reppe	Czech Republic; Radek Musílek; Dana Selnekovičová; Martin Tluk; Jana Břinčilová; Štěpán Beneš
2020	(Finland) Lohja	United States; Matt Thums; Steve Emt; David Samsa; Pam Wilson; Batoyun Uranchimeg	Switzerland; Eric Décorvet; Hans Burgener; Françoise Jaquerod; Laurent Kneubühl; Patrick Delacrétaz	Italy; Egidio Marchese; Orietta Berto; Fabrizio Bich; Angela Menardi; Matteo Ronzani
2022	(Finland) Lohja	Czech Republic; Dana Selnekovičová; Martin Tluk; Milan Bartuněk; Jana Břinčilová; Radek Musílek	Denmark; Kenneth Ørbæk; Michaell Jensen; Niels Nielsen; Sussie Nielsen	Germany; Burkhard Möller; Christiane Putzich; Christoph Gemmer; Heike Melchior
2023	(Finland) Lohja	Slovakia; Peter Zaťko; Radoslav Ďuriš; Dušan Pitoňák; Monika Kunkelová; Adrian Durcek	Estonia; Andrei Koitmäe; Ain Villau; Mait Mätas; Katlin Riidebach; Signe Falkenberg	Italy; Egidio Marchese; Fabrizio Bich; Matteo Ronzani; Orietta Berto; Angela Menardi
2024	(Finland) Lohja	United States; Matthew Thums; Shawn Sadowski; Stephen Emt; Batoyun Uranchimeg; Laura Dwyer	Japan; Hiromi Takahashi; Kazuhiro Kashiwabara; Tsutomu Iwata; Kana Matsuda; Hiroki Kagami	England; Stewart Pimblett; George Potts; Julian Mattison; Karen Aspey; Jason Kean
2026	(Finland) Lohja			
