= Stephan Rauch =

Swiss male curler and coach

- Curler ♂

Team
- Curling club: CC Aarau, Aarau

Curling career
- Member Association: Switzerland
Medal record
Curling

Stephan Rauch is a Swiss curler and curling coach.

== Teams ==
Season	Skip	Third	Second	Lead	Alternate	Events
2011–12	Dany Heyner (fourth)	Stefan Rauch (skip)	Peter Menhorn	Armin Jungo	Eric Keller	SSCC 2012 (7th)

== Record as a coach of national teams ==
Year	Tournament, event	National team	Place
2002	2002 World Wheelchair Curling Championship	Switzerland (wheelchair)	1st place, gold medalist(s)
