= Nadia Röthlisberger-Raspe =

Swiss curler (1972–2015)

Medal record

Representing Switzerland

Women's Curling

Olympic Games
Silver medal – second place	2002 Salt Lake City	Team

World Championships
Silver medal – second place	2000 Glasgow	
Bronze medal – third place	2004 Gävle	

Nadia Röthlisberger-Raspe (30 June 1972 – 9 February 2015) was a Swiss curler and Olympic medalist. She received a silver medal at the 2002 Winter Olympics in Salt Lake City.
