= Karen Blachford =

Canadian wheelchair curler

Personal information
- Born: January 26, 1966 (age 60) Brockville, Ontario, Canada

Sport
- Country: Canada
- Sport: Wheelchair curling
Medal record
Wheelchair curling
Canada
Winter Paralympics
Gold medal – first place	2006 Turin	Wheelchair curling - Mixed

Karen Blachford (born January 26, 1966) is a Canadian wheelchair curler. She was on the team that won gold in wheelchair curling at the 2006 Winter Paralympics.

== Results ==
Paralympic Games
Finish	Event	Year	Place
Gold	Wheelchair Curling	2006	Turin, Italy
