= Frank Duffy (curler) =

Scottish wheelchair curler

Frank Duffy (27 August 1959 – 16 December 2010) was a Scottish wheelchair curler. He was the skip of the silver medal-winning British team at the 2006 Winter Paralympics. He began curling at age 12 and developed paraplegia due to an accident at 35. His career highlights include sharing Gold at the 2004 and 2005 WCF World Championships. Duffy was found dead in his burnt out motor on 16 December 2010, in an apparent suicide.

== Results ==
Paralympic Games
Finish	Event	Year	Place
Silver	Wheelchair curling	2006	Turin, Italy
Wheelchair curling World Championships
Finish	Event	Year	Place
Bronze	Wheelchair curling	2002	Sursee, Switzerland
Gold	Wheelchair curling	2004	Sursee, Switzerland
Gold	Wheelchair curling	2005	Glasgow, Scotland
