= Chris Daw =

Canadian Paralympic curler

Christopher Daw
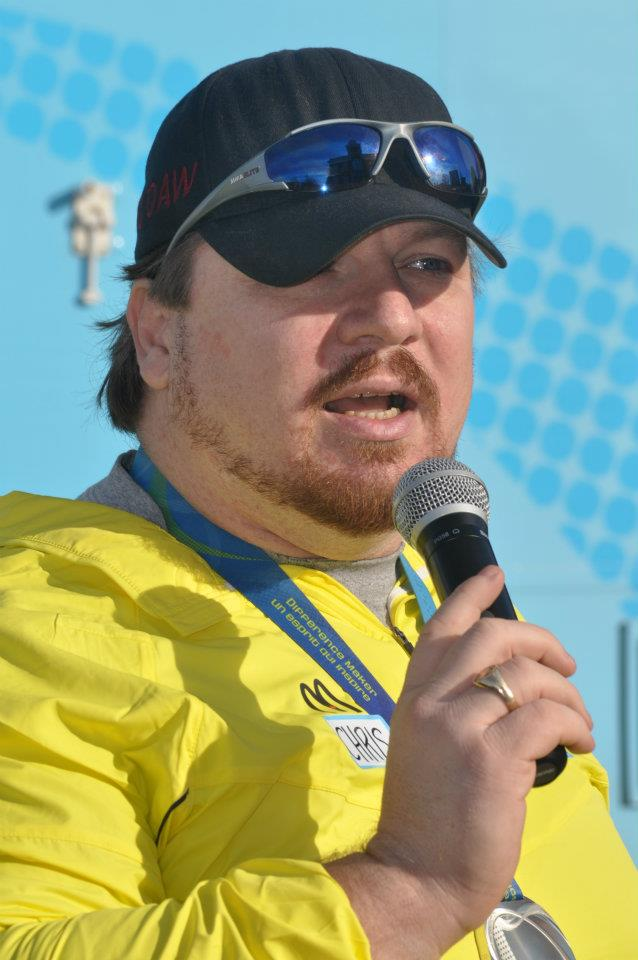

Personal information
- Born: February 1, 1970 North York, Ontario, Canada
- Home town: Strathroy, Ontario
- Education: Strathroy District Collegiate Institute; University of Tennessee
- Occupations: Executive,Manager,Keynote Speaker
- Height: 6 ft 4 in (193 cm)
- Spouse: Elizabeth Daw
- Website: chrisdaw.ca

Sport
- Country: Canada
Medal record
Representing Canada
Wheelchair curling
Paralympic Games
Gold medal – first place	2006 Turin
World Wheelchair Curling Championship
Silver medal – second place	2002 Sursee
Gold medal – first place	2003 (World Cup) Glasgow
Bronze medal – third place	2004 Sursee
Canadian Wheelchair Curling Championship
Gold medal – first place	2004 London
Gold medal – first place	2005 Richmond
Gold medal – first place	2006 Richmond
Sit-volleyball
Para PanAM Games
Bronze medal – third place	2007 Brazil

Christopher "Chris" Daw (born February 1, 1970) is a Canadian Paralympian, multi-sport athlete, and one of Canada's most accomplished wheelchair sport competitors. Over a career spanning more than four decades, Daw represented Canada internationally in adaptive track and field, marathon racing, wheelchair basketball, wheelchair volleyball, wheelchair rugby, and wheelchair curling, earning recognition as a legendary figure in Canadian Paralympic sport.

Daw first gained international prominence in 1986 when he captured six gold medals and set six world records at the inaugural World Games for Disabled Youth in Nottingham, England. He subsequently represented Canada in adaptive track and field at the 1984 and 1988 Paralympic Games, before competing internationally in wheelchair basketball and later wheelchair rugby at the 2000 Summer Paralympics in Sydney.

Following his transition to wheelchair curling in 2000, Daw became one of the pioneers of the sport, helping establish Canada as a world power. He was a member of the Canadian team that won the first-ever Paralympic gold medal awarded in wheelchair curling at the 2006 Winter Paralympics in Turin, Italy. His achievements across multiple sports place him among a select group of Canadian athletes to have competed at the highest international level in both Summer and Winter Paralympic disciplines.

Daw has participated as an athlete in hockey, field, parachuting; rock climbing, badminton and holds high-level black belts in Daitō-ryū Aiki-jūjutsu.

== Curling ==
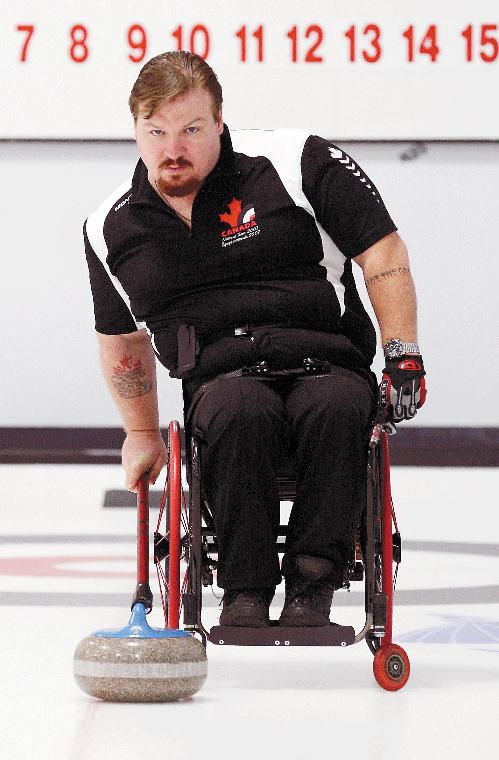
Daw delivering a stone

Daw entered curling in 2000, and helped develop and adapt the sport for the Paralympics. He was the skip of the Canadian team at the 2002 World Wheelchair Curling Championship in Sursee, Switzerland, where after six months of training the team won silver.

In 2003 Daw won Gold at the World Wheelchair cup of curing in Scotland, defeating rival Frank Duffy. The next year, he would again be the skip of the Canadian team and the Wheelchair Curling championship, again in Sursee, where the team won bronze.

He would finish his curling career as the skip of the Canadian team, which won the first ever Gold in Wheelchair curling at the 2006 Winter Paralympics.

In 2007, Daw withdrew his name from the Team Canada selection process that could have led to a spot on the 2010 Winter Paralympics. He resurfaced as part of the Wheelchair Curling Team for Newfoundland as Skip in 2008, and relocated to British Columbia in 2009. He was the General manager of the Vancouver Curling Club when it took over the Olympic Curling center (now Hillcrest Center) in 2011.

In 2010, it was announced that Daw was returning to competitive curling, joining Jim Armstrong. As Armstrong's second on a local British Columbia team in provincial play-downs; with hopes of representing Team BC. Team Armstrong was unsuccessful in capturing the 2011 BC Championship title. Armstrong would later move to Ontario.

Daw announced his retirement in December 2008.

In 2026, after an 18-year absence from high-performance wheelchair curling, Daw returned to competitive play as skip of Team BC #2 at the Canadian Wheelchair Curling Championship in Boucherville, Quebec. Daw, who had previously skipped Canada to a gold medal at the 2006 Winter Paralympics, stated that his return was motivated by a desire to help grow grassroots wheelchair curling while once again representing British Columbia at the national level. His team included veteran curler Frank La Bounty, 2 newcomers and Lead, Elizabeth Daw, Daw's wife.

== Professional career ==
In 2012, Daw signed on with Ken Strong and became executive director of Ice Twice Rinks Inc. in Oakville, Ontario. Programs at the rink were run by experienced coaches such as Al Iafrate, Eddi Choi, Christina Kessler, and Ryan Munce. Daw left Ice Twice Rinks in 2015, which was sold to Jamie Allison; a former NHL player with the Chicago Blackhawks.

Since 2000 Daw has been a reporter on the sport of wheelchair curling. Daw was a commentator with CBC television during the Paralympic games in 2010, 2014 and 2018. Daw has also worked with CBC on other ventures, including the 2018 Canadian Wheelchair Curling Championships.

During his athletic career, Daw has attended over 125 National Championships, 64 World Championships, 4 Paralympics, and 1 Olympics with an estimated medal total of over 1000+ for Canada including a dozen World Championships, 19 World records, and Paralympic Gold medal performances.

== Personal life ==
In 2006 it was reported that Daw had one child a son; Kyle, with his first wife Mari Brown. Daw's daughter Arowyn was born in February 2010 with his second wife Morgan Perry. Daw married military veteran Elizabeth van Drongelen on August 19th, 2021. On September 15, 2021, Daw's daughter Chantelle Daw died at the age of 27.

In April 2010, Daw lost his mother Eleanor Daw. According to Daw, her loss has had a profound change in him which he often referred to the reason behind his retirement from international sport. Daw would later lose his Father Ivan Daw in November of 2022

In 2010, Daw was inducted into the London Sports Hall of Fame on September 23, 2010

== Selected results ==
Olympic Games
Finish	Event	Year	Place	Position	Team
Alternate	Wheelchair Adaptive Track	1984	Los Angeles, United States	Alternate	Canada
Paralympic Games
Finish	Event	Year	Place	Position	Team
Gold	Wheelchair Curling	2006	Turin, Italy	Skip	Canada
4th	Wheelchair Rugby	2000	Sydney, Australia	Player #10	Canada
Bronze	Wheelchair Adaptive Track	1988	Seoul, South Korea	Participant	Canada
Gold	Wheelchair Adaptive Track	1984	Stoke Mandeville, United Kingdom	Participant (4 × 100 m)	Canada
Para PanAM Games
Finish	Event	Year	Place	Position	Team
Bronze	Sit-Volleyball	2007	Rio de Janeiro, Brazil	Player	Canada
World Wheelchair Curling Championship
Finish	Event	Year	Place	Position	Team
Silver	Wheelchair curling	2002	Sursee, Switzerland	Skip	Canada
Gold	Wheelchair Curling World Cup	2003	Glasgow, Scotland	Skip	Canada
Bronze	Wheelchair curling	2004	Sursee, Switzerland	Skip	Canada
6.	Wheelchair curling	2005	Glasgow, Scotland	Skip	Canada
4.	Wheelchair curling	2007	Sollefteå, Sweden	Skip	Canada
Canadian Wheelchair Curling Championship
Finish	Event	Year	Place	Position	Team
Gold	Wheelchair curling	2003	Toronto, Canada	Skip	Canada
Gold	Wheelchair curling	2005	Richmond, Canada	Skip	Canada
Gold	Wheelchair curling	2006	Richmond, Canada	Skip	Canada
6th	Wheelchair curling	2009	Halifax, Canada	Skip	Newfoundland and Labrador
11th	Wheelchair curling	2026	Boucherville, Canada	Skip	British Columbia
Provincial Wheelchair Curling Championship
Finish	Event	Year	Place	Position	Team
Bronze	Wheelchair curling	2011	Kimberley, Canada	2nd	Armstrong
Silver	Wheelchair Curling	2026	Richmond, Canada	Skip	Daw
First World Games for Disabled Youth (Nottingham, England)
Finish	Event	Year	Place	Result	Team
Gold	Wheelchair Adaptive Track	1986	United Kingdom Nottingham	World Record	Canada
Gold	Wheelchair Adaptive Track	1986	United Kingdom Nottingham	World Record	Canada
Gold	Wheelchair Adaptive Track	1986	United Kingdom Nottingham	World Record	Canada
Gold	Wheelchair Adaptive Track	1986	United Kingdom Nottingham	World Record	Canada
Gold	Wheelchair Adaptive Track	1986	United Kingdom Nottingham	World Record	Canada
Gold	Wheelchair Adaptive Track	1986	United Kingdom Nottingham	World Record	Canada
Awards and Recognition
Award	Awarded by;	Description	Place	Year	Country
Rick Hansan Relay	Town of Strathroy	Medal Bearer	Ontario Strathroy, Ontario	2011	Canada
Hall of Fame	City of London	London Sports Hall of Fame	Ontario London, Ontario	2010	Canada
King Clancy Award	King Clancy Foundation	Outstanding Performance	Ontario	2007	Canada
High Performance Coach of the Year	Province of Ontario	Coach of the Year, Wheelchair Athletics	Ontario	2007	Canada
International Achievement Award	Government of Canada	Achievement Award	Canada	2006	Canada
World Achievement Award	Government of Canada	Achievement Award	Canada	2006	Canada
National Achievement Award	Government of Canada	Achievement Award	Canada	2006	Canada
Provincial Achievement Award	Province of Ontario	Achievement Award	Ontario	2006	Canada
Queen Elizabeth II Golden Jubilee Medal	Government of Canada	Achievement Award	Canada	2002	Canada
International Achievement Award	Government of Canada	Achievement Award	Canada	2000	Canada
World Achievement Award	Government of Canada	Achievement Award	Canada	2000	Canada
Celebration 88 Medal	Government of Canada	Achievement Award	Canada	1988	Canada
International Achievement Award	Government of Canada	Achievement Award	Canada	1988	Canada
JFO Recognition	Multi Governments	Awards	United KingdomUnited States	1991	United KingdomUnited States
World Award	Government of Canada	Achievement Award	Canada	1988	Canada
National Achievement Award	Government of Canada	Achievement Award	Canada	1988	Canada
Provincial Achievement Award	Province of Ontario	Achievement Award	Ontario	1988	Canada
Breaking Barrieirs Award	Curl BC	Nomination	British Columbia	2026	Canada

== Filmography ==
=== Television ===
Year 2005 - 2022	Title	Role	Notes
2007–2022	CBC Television - Olympic/Paralympic Games	ON Air talent/Analyst/ Voice over artist	Credited

=== Live streaming ===
Year	Title	Role	Notes
2007–2022	Canadian Curling Association - National Championships	Producer/Commentator	Credited

=== Film ===
Year	Title	Role	Notes
2005	Murderball	Athlete	Uncredited
