= Michael McCreadie =

Personal information
- Born: 16 March 1946 (age 80) Glasgow, Scotland

Sport
- Country: Scotland; Great Britain
- Sport: Swimming; Lawn bowls Wheelchair basketball Wheelchair curling
Medal record
Representing Great Britain
Lawn bowls
Summer Paralympic Games
Bronze medal – third place	1976 Toronto	Singles wh
Bronze medal – third place	1976 Toronto	Pairs wh
Representing Great Britain
Wheelchair curling
Winter Paralympic Games
Silver medal – second place	2006 Turin	Mixed competition

Michael McCreadie (born 16 March 1946) is a Paralympian with successes in lawn bowls and wheelchair curling. He made his debut at the 1972 Summer Paralympics in Heidelberg as a swimmer. He won two bronze medals in lawn bowls at the 1976 Summer Paralympics. He also competed in swimming and wheelchair basketball at the same Games and captained the British wheelchair basketball team at the 1980 Summer Paralympics. After that he coached the British wheelchair basketball team at the 1988 and 1992 Summer Paralympics.

In 2001 he took up wheelchair curling after trying the sport at his local rink at Braehead. He was part of the Scotland rink which won a bronze at the 2002 and 2007 World Wheelchair Curling Championship, gold at the 2004 and 2005 World Championship, and was on the silver medal-winning team at the 2006 Winter Paralympics. He was the skip for the British team in Wheelchair curling at the 2010 Winter Paralympics and carried the British flag in the opening ceremony.

His disability was caused by poliomyelitis, which he contracted in 1947.

His partner is former teammate and successor as skip of the British Paralympic rink Aileen Neilson.
