= Wheelchair curling =

Curling played by people in wheelchairs

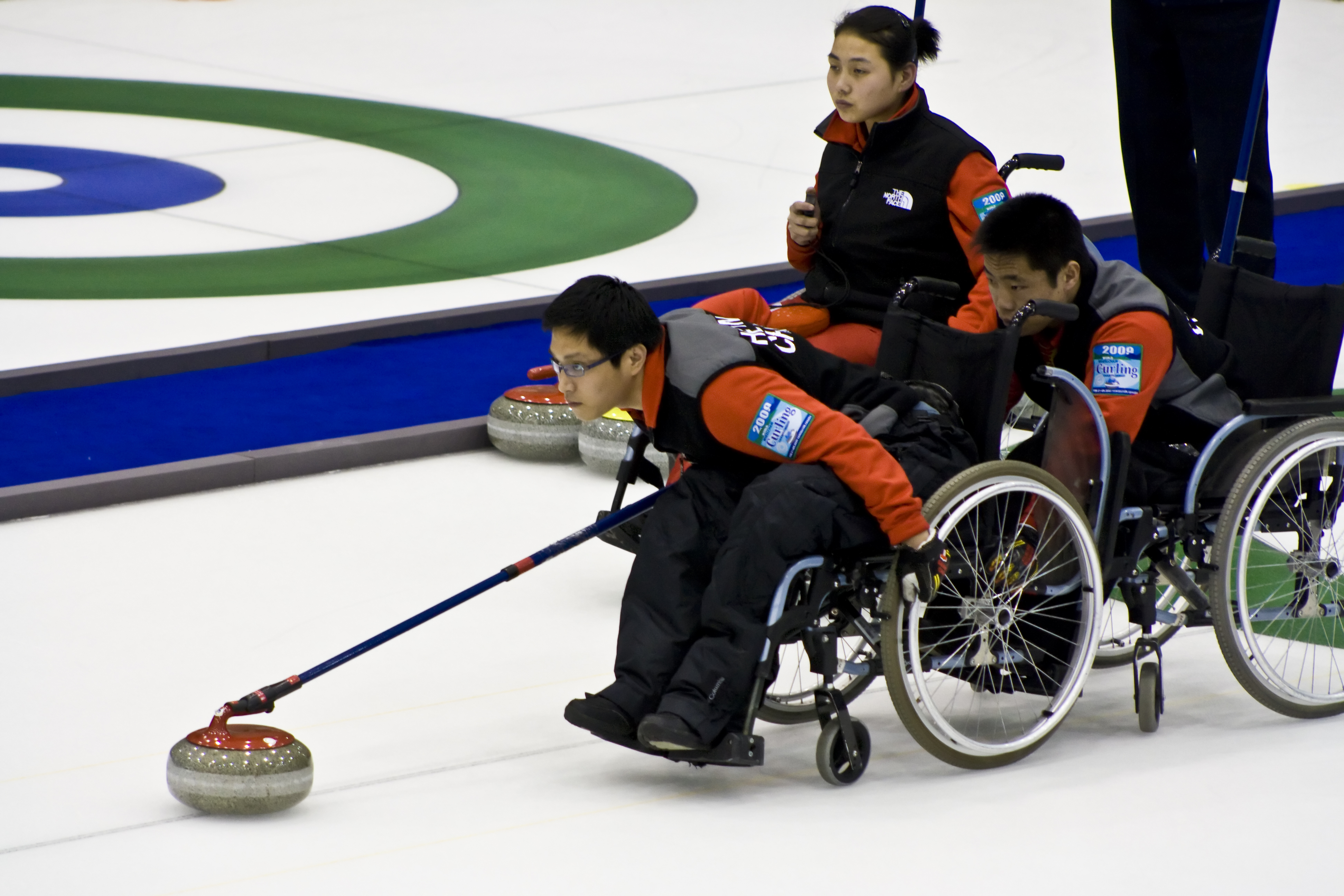
Wheelchair curling at the 2009 World Wheelchair Curling Championship

Wheelchair curling is an adaptation of curling for athletes with a disability affecting their lower limbs or gait. Wheelchair curling is governed by World Curling, and is one of the sports in the Winter Paralympic Games. There were two events in the Milano Cortina 2026 Paralympics: mixed team events and mixed doubles.

== Overview ==
Wheelchair curling pictogram for the Winter Paralympic Games

Wheelchair curling is played with the same rocks and on the same ice as regular curling, though the rocks are thrown from a stationary wheelchair and there is no sweeping. Rocks may be thrown by hand while leaning over the side of the wheelchair, or pushed by a delivery stick. This is a pole with a bracket that fits over the rock handle, allowing the rock to be pushed while applying correct rotation.

Without the need for sweepers, wheelchair curling is well suited to two-person formats such as stick-curling. To throw the stone, athletes can use their arm to release or use extenders to increase speed and direction, Stones in curling weight up to 19,96 kg and are made of granite.

== Rules ==
National and international competitions are played under rules devised by World Curling. These rules mandate that teams be of mixed gender, and that games be eight ends in duration. Time limits of 38 minutes of thinking time for each team with one 60-second timeout will be enforced by time clocks. Stones delivered between the house and the near hogline must be placed within 18 inches on either side of the centre line and must be released prior to reaching the near hogline. The goal of the game is to place the stone as close as possible to the main circle, called the house.

Eligibility is limited to people with disabilities such that a wheelchair is used for daily mobility – more specifically, those who are non-ambulant or can walk only very short distances.

== History ==
Wheelchair curling began in Europe in the late 1990s and in North America in 2002. The first World Wheelchair Curling Championship was held in Sursee, Switzerland in 2002, and was won by the host nation who beat Canada 7–6 in the final. Canada, skipped by Chris Daw, won the gold medal, beating Great Britain, skipped by Frank Duffy, 7–4 in the final.

The 2009 World Championship was held in Vancouver, British Columbia, Canada in the same venue used for the 2010 Olympic and Paralympic Winter Games. Team Canada, skipped by 6-time Brier competitor Jim Armstrong, finished the round robin in 4th place but defeated USA 9–2 in the Page playoff, Germany 10–4 in the semi-final and Sweden 9–2 in the final to win their first ever Worlds gold medal.

Canada repeated as Paralympic Champions in Vancouver 2010 when the all-British Columbia team of Sonja Gaudet, Ina Forrest, Darryl Neighbour and skip Jim Armstrong, after taking an early 8–1 lead, defeated South Korea 8-7 for the gold medal. Sweden, who had their 3rd Glenn Ikonen disqualified for failing a drug test, beat USA 7–5 to win bronze.

At their April 2010 semi-annual meeting, the World Curling Federation lifted its ban on the use of power chairs at WCF sanctioned events.

== World championship ==
- 2002: Switzerland (Urs Bucher)
- 2004: Scotland (Frank Duffy)
- 2005: Scotland (Frank Duffy)
- 2007: Norway (Rune Lorentsen)
- 2008: Norway (Rune Lorentsen)
- 2009: Canada (Jim Armstrong)
- 2011: Canada (Jim Armstrong)
- 2012: Russia (Andrey Smirnov)
- 2013: Canada (Jim Armstrong)
- 2015: Russia (Andrey Smirnov)
- 2016: Russia (Andrey Smirnov)
- 2017: Norway (Rune Lorentsen)
- 2019: China (Wang Haitao)
- 2020: Russia (Konstantin Kurokhtin)
- 2021: China (Wang Haitao)
- 2023: China (Wang Haitao)
- 2024: Norway (Jostein Stordahl)
- 2025: China (Wang Haitao)

== Winter Paralympic Games ==
Wheelchair curling made its Paralympic debut at the Torino 2006 Paralympic Winter Games with mixed team events being present ever since. Milano Cortina 2026 Paralympic Games featured mixed doubles for the first time in wheeclchairahit curling programme. Canada is the sole nation to have achieve a winwon a medal at each Winter Games with gold medals in Torino 2006, Vancouver 2010 and Sochi 2014, winning and bronze in PyeongChang 2018 and Beijing 2022. At Milano Cortina 2026, Canada won a gold in the mixed team event.

- 2006: Canada (Chris Daw)
- 2010: Canada (Jim Armstrong)
- 2014: Canada (Jim Armstrong)
- 2018: China (Wang Haitao)
- 2022: China (Wang Haitao)
- 2026: Canada (Mark Ideson)
