= Great Britain at the 2026 Winter Paralympics =

- IPC code: GBR
- Website: www.paralympics.org.uk

in Milan and Cortina d'Ampezzo, Italy 6 March 2026 – 15 March 2026
- Flag bearers: Menna Fitzpatrick; Scott Meenagh
- Medals Ranked 23rd: Gold 0 Silver 1 Bronze 0 Total 1

Winter Paralympics appearances (overview)
- 1976; 1980; 1984; 1988; 1992; 1994; 1998; 2002; 2006; 2010; 2014; 2018; 2022; 2026

Great Britain competed at the 2026 Winter Paralympics in Milan and Cortina d'Ampezzo, Italy, from 6 to 15 March 2026. This was Great Britain's fourteenth consecutive appearance at the Winter Paralympic Games since the inaugural event in 1976.

The British Paralympic Association announced the first wave of athletes in December 2025, with 6 competitors confirmed across three sports: alpine skiing, biathlon, and snowboard. 7 further athletes were announced later in December 2025 for the wheelchair curling. A third and final wave of athletes were announced in February 2026 bringing the total to 25.

== Medalists ==
The following Italy competitors won medals at the games. In the discipline sections below, the medalists' names are bolded.

Medal	Name	Sport	Event	Date
Silver	Neil Simpson; Guide: Rob Poth	Para alpine skiing	Men's super combined, visually impaired	10 March

== Alpine skiing ==
Representing Great Britain in Alpine skiing at the 2026 Winter Paralympics are:

=== Women ===
Athlete	Classification	Event	Run 1		Run 2		Final/Total		
Athlete	Classification	Event	Time	Rank	Time	Rank	Time	Diff	Rank
Menna Fitzpatrick Guide: Katie Guest	Visually impaired	Women's giant slalom	1:16.92	7	1:19.59	6	2:36.51	+17.88	6
Menna Fitzpatrick Guide: Katie Guest	Visually impaired	Women's slalom	47.37	5	48.30	6	1:35.67	+12.94	5
Menna Fitzpatrick Guide: Katie Guest	Visually impaired	Women's super-G	—N/a				1:25.52	+10.68	6
Menna Fitzpatrick Guide: Katie Guest	Visually impaired	Women’s super combined	1:30.44	9	50.44	6	2:20.88	+19.13	9
Hester Poole; Guide: Ali Hall	Visually impaired	Women's giant slalom	DNF						
Hester Poole; Guide: Ali Hall	Visually impaired	Women's slalom	DSQ						

=== Men ===
Athlete	Classification	Event	Run 1		Run 2		Final/Total		
Athlete	Classification	Event	Time	Rank	Time	Rank	Time	Diff	Rank
**Neil Simpson**; **Guides: Andrew Simpson** **and Rob Poth**	Visually impaired	Men's downhill	—N/a				1:21.31	+5.23	4
**Neil Simpson**; **Guides: Andrew Simpson** **and Rob Poth**	Visually impaired	Men's giant slalom	DNF						
**Neil Simpson**; **Guides: Andrew Simpson** **and Rob Poth**	Visually impaired	Men's slalom	DNF						
**Neil Simpson**; **Guides: Andrew Simpson** **and Rob Poth**	Visually impaired	Men's super-G	—N/a				1:14.39	+2.40	4
**Neil Simpson**; **Guides: Andrew Simpson** **and Rob Poth**	Visually impaired	Men’s super combined	1:14.55	4	42.52	1	1:57.07	+0.65	2nd place, silver medalist(s)
Sam Cozens; Guide: Adam Hall	Visually impaired	Men's giant slalom	1:14.07	11	DNF				
Sam Cozens; Guide: Adam Hall	Visually impaired	Men's slalom	55.97	12	52.95	12	1:48.92	+19.63	12
Fred Warburton; Guide: James Hannan	Visually impaired	Men's downhill	—N/a				1:30.32	+14.24	7
Fred Warburton; Guide: James Hannan	Visually impaired	Men's giant slalom	1:20.19	14	1:18.78	12	2:38.97	+31.14	12
Fred Warburton; Guide: James Hannan	Visually impaired	Men's super-G	—N/a				1:24.03	+12.04	12
Fred Warburton; Guide: James Hannan	Visually impaired	Men’s super combined	DNF						
Dominic Allen	Standing	Men's giant slalom	1:20.66	27	1:20.69	25	2:41.35	+33.59	25
Dominic Allen	Standing	Men's slalom	55.94	19	50.05	19	1:45.99	+17.44	19

== Snowboard ==
Representing Great Britain in Snowboard at the 2026 Winter Paralympics are:

=== Women ===
==== Banked slalom ====
Athlete	Event	Run 1	Run 2	Best	Rank
Nina Sparks	Banked slalom, SB-LL2	1:13.23	1:12.79	1:12.79	10

=== Men ===
==== Banked slalom ====
Athlete	Event	Run 1	Run 2	Best	Rank
Ollie Hill	Banked slalom, SB-LL2	58.23	58.30	58.23	7
Matt Hamilton	Banked slalom, SB-UL	1:01.81	1:01.46	1:01.46	11
Dave Zyw	Banked slalom, SB-UL	1:08.14	1:08.39	1:08.14	19
James Barnes-Miller	Banked slalom, SB-UL	1:00.42	59.08	59.08	7

==== Snowboard cross ====
Athlete	Event	Qualification				Round of 16	Quarterfinal	Semifinal	Final	
Athlete	Event	Run 1	Run 2	Best	Seed	Position	Position	Position	Position	Rank
Dave Zyw	Snowboard cross, SB-UL	58.67	58.58	58.58	18	DNF				
James Barnes-Miller	Snowboard cross, SB-UL	54.08	52.17	52.17	5	—N/a	4	Did not advance		

Qualification legend: FA – Qualify to medal round; FB – Qualify to consolation round

== Nordic skiing ==
Representing Great Britain in Nordic Skiing at the 2026 Winter Paralympics are:

=== Cross country ===
==== Men ====
Athlete	Classification	Event	Qualification		Semifinal		Final	
Athlete	Classification	Event	Time	Rank	Time	Rank	Time	Rank
Scott Meenagh	Sitting	20 km	—N/a				57:49.7	15

=== Biathlon ===
==== Men ====
Athlete	Classification	Event	Result	Rank
Scott Meenagh	Sitting	Individual	42:59.9	18
Scott Meenagh	Sitting	Sprint pursuit	12:09.0	14
Scott Meenagh	Sitting	Sprint	24:54.3	23

== Wheelchair curling ==
Summary

Team	Event	Group stage										Semifinal	Final / BM	
Team	Event	Opposition Score	Opposition Score	Opposition Score	Opposition Score	Opposition Score	Opposition Score	Opposition Score	Opposition Score	Opposition Score	Rank	Opposition Score	Opposition Score	Rank
Hugh Nibloe; Stewart Pimblett; Austin McKenzie; Karen Aspey; Graeme Stewart	Mixed team	SVK; **L** 2–9	USA; **W** 6–5	CAN; **L** 4–5	KOR; **L** 6–7	SWE; **L** 5–6	ITA; **L** 6–8	CHN; **L** 4–9	LAT; **L** 5–8	NOR; **L** 2–9	10	Did not advance		
Jo Butterfield; Jason Kean	Mixed doubles	EST; **L** 7–10	KOR; **L** 3–14	LAT; **W** 6–5	USA; **W** 5–4	JPN; **W** 11–2	CHN; **L** 10–5	ITA; **L** 10–11	—N/a		5	Did not advance		

=== Mixed tournament ===
Final Round Robin Standings
Team	Skip	Pld	W	L	W–L	PF	PA	EW	EL	BE	SE	S%	DSC	Qualification
Canada	Mark Ideson	9	9	0	–	71	36	36	26	2	19	68.2%	84.488	Playoffs
China	Wang Haitao	9	8	1	–	76	42	38	26	1	15	68.3%	83.350	Playoffs
Sweden	Viljo Petersson-Dahl	9	5	4	1–0	47	48	31	31	6	13	62.8%	98.125	Playoffs
South Korea	Yang Hui-tae	9	5	4	0–1	55	48	36	32	1	17	64.6%	90.525	Playoffs
Norway	Jostein Stordahl	9	4	5	1–0	41	55	28	31	2	12	58.3%	130.863	
Italy	Egidio Marchese	9	4	5	0–1	52	53	32	27	0	15	60.6%	107.831	
Latvia	Ojārs Briedis	9	3	6	2–0	45	67	27	33	0	12	50.2%	113.381	
Slovakia	Radoslav Ďuriš	9	3	6	1–1	42	56	26	37	1	13	51.9%	117.688	
United States	Sean O'Neill	9	3	6	0–2	54	52	34	32	0	14	58.3%	72.156	
Great Britain	Hugh Nibloe	9	1	8	–	40	66	26	39	0	7	55.7%	129.675	

Source: Official website

Round robin
Great Britain had a bye in draws 4, 8 and 11.

Draw 1
Saturday, 7 March, 9:35

**Sheet A**	**1**	**2**	**3**	**4**	**5**	**6**	**7**	**8**	**Final**
Great Britain (Nibloe)	0	0	2	0	0	0	0	X	**2**
**Slovakia (Ďuriš) 🔨**	1	1	0	1	4	1	1	X	**9**

Draw 2
Saturday, 7 March, 18:35

**Sheet B**	**1**	**2**	**3**	**4**	**5**	**6**	**7**	**8**	**EE**	**Final**
United States (O'Neill) 🔨	1	0	2	0	0	1	0	1	0	**5**
**Great Britain (Nibloe)**	0	2	0	1	1	0	1	0	1	**6**

Draw 3
Sunday, 8 March, 9:35

**Sheet D**	**1**	**2**	**3**	**4**	**5**	**6**	**7**	**8**	**Final**
**Canada (Ideson) 🔨**	0	0	1	1	0	0	0	3	**5**
Great Britain (Nibloe)	0	1	0	0	1	1	1	0	**4**

Draw 5
Monday, 9 March, 9:35

**Sheet A**	**1**	**2**	**3**	**4**	**5**	**6**	**7**	**8**	**Final**
**South Korea (Yang)**	1	2	0	0	0	2	0	2	**7**
Great Britain (Nibloe) 🔨	0	0	1	2	1	0	2	0	**6**

Draw 6
Monday, 9 March, 18:35

**Sheet C**	**1**	**2**	**3**	**4**	**5**	**6**	**7**	**8**	**Final**
Great Britain (Nibloe)	0	2	0	0	0	3	0	0	**5**
**Sweden (Petersson-Dahl) 🔨**	1	0	0	1	1	0	2	1	**6**

Draw 7
Tuesday, 10 March, 9:35

**Sheet B**	**1**	**2**	**3**	**4**	**5**	**6**	**7**	**8**	**Final**
Great Britain (Nibloe) 🔨	0	3	0	0	2	0	1	X	**6**
**Italy (Marchese)**	1	0	1	3	0	3	0	X	**8**

Draw 9
Wednesday, 11 March, 9:05

**Sheet D**	**1**	**2**	**3**	**4**	**5**	**6**	**7**	**8**	**Final**
Great Britain (Nibloe)	0	2	1	0	1	0	0	X	**4**
**China (Wang) 🔨**	3	0	0	1	0	2	3	X	**9**

Draw 10
Wednesday, 11 March, 20:05

**Sheet C**	**1**	**2**	**3**	**4**	**5**	**6**	**7**	**8**	**Final**
**Latvia (Briedis) 🔨**	4	0	1	0	1	2	0	X	**8**
Great Britain (Nibloe)	0	2	0	2	0	0	1	X	**5**

Draw 12
Thursday, 12 March, 18:35

**Sheet B**	**1**	**2**	**3**	**4**	**5**	**6**	**7**	**8**	**Final**
**Norway (Stordahl)**	0	1	1	1	3	3	X	X	**9**
Great Britain (Nibloe) 🔨	2	0	0	0	0	0	X	X	**2**

=== Mixed doubles ===
Final Round Robin Standings
Team	Athletes	Pld	W	L	W–L	PF	PA	EW	EL	BE	SE	S%	DSC	Qualification
China	Wang Meng / Yang Jinqiao	7	6	1	–	66	32	32	21	0	14	64.9%	106.033	Playoffs
United States	Laura Dwyer / Stephen Emt	7	4	3	1–1	43	43	25	27	0	9	53.4%	89.717	Playoffs
South Korea	Baek Hye-jin / Lee Yong-suk	7	4	3	1–1	58	26	30	19	0	17	59.9%	142.058	Playoffs
Latvia	Poļina Rožkova / Agris Lasmans	7	4	3	1–1	46	45	28	25	0	12	48.5%	150.675	Playoffs
Great Britain	Jo Butterfield / Jason Kean	7	3	4	1–0	47	56	25	29	0	8	51.5%	95.075	
Japan	Aki Ogawa / Yoji Nakajima	7	3	4	0–1	30	53	19	30	0	8	49.0%	88.067	
Estonia	Katlin Riidebach / Ain Villau	7	2	5	1–0	31	58	22	28	0	9	47.6%	98.233	
Italy	Orietta Bertò / Paolo Ioriatti	7	2	5	0–1	43	51	28	30	0	11	55.6%	73.700	

Source: Official website

Round robin

Draw 1
Wednesday, 4 March, 19:05

**Sheet C**	**1**	**2**	**3**	**4**	**5**	**6**	**7**	**8**	**Final**
Great Britain (Butterfield / Kean)	0	2	0	0	2	3	0	0	**7**
**Estonia (Riidebach / Villau) 🔨**	2	0	2	1	0	0	3	2	**10**

Draw 2
Thursday, 5 March, 10:05

**Sheet D**	**1**	**2**	**3**	**4**	**5**	**6**	**7**	**8**	**Final**
Great Britain (Butterfield / Kean) 🔨	1	0	1	0	0	1	0	X	**3**
**South Korea (Baek / Lee)**	0	3	0	5	2	0	4	X	**14**

Draw 3
Thursday, 5 March, 19:05

**Sheet C**	**1**	**2**	**3**	**4**	**5**	**6**	**7**	**8**	**Final**
Latvia (Rožkova / Lasmans)	1	0	1	0	0	1	1	1	**5**
**Great Britain (Butterfield / Kean) 🔨**	0	3	0	2	1	0	0	0	**6**

Draw 4
Friday, 6 March, 9:05

**Sheet B**	**1**	**2**	**3**	**4**	**5**	**6**	**7**	**8**	**Final**
**Great Britain (Butterfield / Kean)**	1	0	0	1	0	2	0	1	**5**
United States (Dwyer / Emt) 🔨	0	1	1	0	1	0	1	0	**4**

Draw 5
Saturday, 7 March, 14:35

**Sheet D**	**1**	**2**	**3**	**4**	**5**	**6**	**7**	**8**	**Final**
Japan (Ogawa / Nakajima)	0	0	0	0	0	2	0	X	**2**
**Great Britain (Butterfield / Kean) 🔨**	2	2	1	1	2	0	3	X	**11**

Draw 6
Sunday, 8 March, 14:35

**Sheet A**	**1**	**2**	**3**	**4**	**5**	**6**	**7**	**8**	**Final**
Great Britain (Butterfield / Kean) 🔨	3	0	2	0	0	0	0	X	**5**
**China (Wang / Yang)**	0	1	0	2	2	3	2	X	**10**

Draw 7
Monday, 9 March, 14:35

**Sheet B**	**1**	**2**	**3**	**4**	**5**	**6**	**7**	**8**	**EE**	**Final**
**Italy (Bertò / Ioriatti) 🔨**	4	1	0	2	0	3	0	0	1	**11**
Great Britain (Butterfield / Kean)	0	0	2	0	2	0	3	3	0	**10**

== See also ==
- Great Britain at the 2026 Winter Olympics
- Great Britain at the 2024 Summer Paralympics
- Great Britain at the Paralympics
- 2026 Winter Paralympics
