= Latvia at the 2026 Winter Paralympics =

- Flag of Latvia
- IPC code: LAT
- NPC: Latvian Paralympic Committee
- Website: www.lpkomiteja.lv

in Milan and Cortina d'Ampezzo, Italy 6 March 2026 – 15 March 2026
- Competitors: 7 (3 men and 4 women) in 1 sport and 2 events
- Flag bearers: Poļina Rožkova; Agris Lasmans
- Medals Ranked 27th: Gold 0 Silver 0 Bronze 1 Total 1

Winter Paralympics appearances (overview)
- 1994; 1998–2002; 2006; 2010–2018; 2022; 2026

Other related appearances
- Soviet Union (1988)

Latvia competed at the 2026 Winter Paralympics in Milan and Cortina d'Ampezzo, Italy, from 6 to 15 March 2026.

On 11 March 2026, Latvia won the first medal in their Winter Paralympics history, with Poļina Rožkova and Agris Lasmans's bronze medal in the mixed doubles curling.

== Medallists ==
Medal	Name	Sport	Event	Date
Bronze	Poļina Rožkova; Agris Lasmans	Wheelchair curling	Mixed doubles	11 March

== Competitors ==
Sport	Men	Women	Total
Wheelchair curling	3	4	7
Total	3	4	7

== Wheelchair curling ==
Summary

Team	Event	Group stage										Semifinal	Final / BM	
Team	Event	Opposition Score	Opposition Score	Opposition Score	Opposition Score	Opposition Score	Opposition Score	Opposition Score	Opposition Score	Opposition Score	Rank	Opposition Score	Opposition Score	Rank
Sergejs Djačenko; Ojārs Briedis; Linda Meijere; Adelaida Killiane; Elija Asniņa	Mixed team	KOR; L 2–10	SVK; W 9–0	SWE; L 2–10	CAN; L 1–11	USA; W 8–6	CHN; L 5–9	NOR; L 5–6	GBR; W 8–5	ITA; L 5–10	7	Did not advance		
Poļina Rožkova; Agris Lasmans	Mixed doubles	USA; L 6–11	CHN; L 2–10	GBR; L 5–6	EST; W 9–6	ITA; W 9–4	KOR; W 5–4	JPN; W 10–4	—N/a		4 Q	CHN; L 3–8	USA; W 11–10	3rd place, bronze medalist(s)

=== Mixed tournament ===
Final Round Robin Standings
Team	Skip	Pld	W	L	W–L	PF	PA	EW	EL	BE	SE	S%	DSC	Qualification
Canada	Mark Ideson	9	9	0	–	71	36	36	26	2	19	68.2%	84.488	Playoffs
China	Wang Haitao	9	8	1	–	76	42	38	26	1	15	68.3%	83.350	Playoffs
Sweden	Viljo Petersson-Dahl	9	5	4	1–0	47	48	31	31	6	13	62.8%	98.125	Playoffs
South Korea	Yang Hui-tae	9	5	4	0–1	55	48	36	32	1	17	64.6%	90.525	Playoffs
Norway	Jostein Stordahl	9	4	5	1–0	41	55	28	31	2	12	58.3%	130.863	
Italy	Egidio Marchese	9	4	5	0–1	52	53	32	27	0	15	60.6%	107.831	
Latvia	Ojārs Briedis	9	3	6	2–0	45	67	27	33	0	12	50.2%	113.381	
Slovakia	Radoslav Ďuriš	9	3	6	1–1	42	56	26	37	1	13	51.9%	117.688	
United States	Sean O'Neill	9	3	6	0–2	54	52	34	32	0	14	58.3%	72.156	
Great Britain	Hugh Nibloe	9	1	8	–	40	66	26	39	0	7	55.7%	129.675	

Source: Official website

Round robin
Latvia had a bye in draws 4, 7 and 12.

Draw 1
Saturday, March 7, 9:35

Sheet B	1	2	3	4	5	6	7	8	Final
South Korea (Yang) 🔨	5	1	0	1	0	3	X	X	10
Latvia (Briedis)	0	0	1	0	1	0	X	X	2

Draw 2
Saturday, March 7, 18:35

Sheet D	1	2	3	4	5	6	7	8	Final
Latvia (Briedis)	2	1	1	1	2	2	X	X	9
Slovakia (Ďuriš) 🔨	0	0	0	0	0	0	X	X	0

Draw 3
Sunday, March 8, 9:35

Sheet A	1	2	3	4	5	6	7	8	Final
Sweden (Petersson-Dahl)	1	4	3	0	2	0	X	X	10
Latvia (Briedis) 🔨	0	0	0	1	0	1	X	X	2

Draw 5
Monday, March 9, 9:35

Sheet C	1	2	3	4	5	6	7	8	Final
Canada (Ideson)	3	1	1	4	2	0	X	X	11
Latvia (Briedis) 🔨	0	0	0	0	0	1	X	X	1

Draw 6
Monday, March 9, 18:35

Sheet D	1	2	3	4	5	6	7	8	Final
United States (O'Neill) 🔨	0	0	0	0	1	2	3	X	6
Latvia (Briedis)	2	2	1	3	0	0	0	X	8

Draw 8
Tuesday, March 10, 18:35

Sheet B	1	2	3	4	5	6	7	8	Final
Latvia (Briedis)	0	0	1	0	1	0	3	X	5
China (Wang) 🔨	1	2	0	3	0	3	0	X	9

Draw 9
Wednesday, March 11, 9:05

Sheet A	1	2	3	4	5	6	7	8	Final
Latvia (Briedis)	0	0	0	1	0	3	1	0	5
Norway (Stordahl) 🔨	1	1	1	0	1	0	0	2	6

Draw 10
Wednesday, March 11, 20:05

Sheet C	1	2	3	4	5	6	7	8	Final
Latvia (Briedis) 🔨	4	0	1	0	1	2	0	X	8
Great Britain (Nibloe)	0	2	0	2	0	0	1	X	5

Draw 11
Thursday, March 12, 13:35

Sheet D	1	2	3	4	5	6	7	8	Final
Italy (Marchese) 🔨	2	0	1	0	2	3	2	X	10
Latvia (Briedis)	0	3	0	2	0	0	0	X	5

=== Mixed doubles ===
Final Round Robin Standings
Team	Athletes	Pld	W	L	W–L	PF	PA	EW	EL	BE	SE	S%	DSC	Qualification
China	Wang Meng / Yang Jinqiao	7	6	1	–	66	32	32	21	0	14	64.9%	106.033	Playoffs
United States	Laura Dwyer / Stephen Emt	7	4	3	1–1	43	43	25	27	0	9	53.4%	89.717	Playoffs
South Korea	Baek Hye-jin / Lee Yong-suk	7	4	3	1–1	58	26	30	19	0	17	59.9%	142.058	Playoffs
Latvia	Poļina Rožkova / Agris Lasmans	7	4	3	1–1	46	45	28	25	0	12	48.5%	150.675	Playoffs
Great Britain	Jo Butterfield / Jason Kean	7	3	4	1–0	47	56	25	29	0	8	51.5%	95.075	
Japan	Aki Ogawa / Yoji Nakajima	7	3	4	0–1	30	53	19	30	0	8	49.0%	88.067	
Estonia	Katlin Riidebach / Ain Villau	7	2	5	1–0	31	58	22	28	0	9	47.6%	98.233	
Italy	Orietta Bertò / Paolo Ioriatti	7	2	5	0–1	43	51	28	30	0	11	55.6%	73.700	

Source: Official website

Round robin

Draw 1
Wednesday, March 4, 19:05

Sheet D	1	2	3	4	5	6	7	8	Final
Latvia (Rožkova / Lasmans)	0	0	4	0	1	1	0	0	6
United States (Dwyer / Emt) 🔨	1	2	0	3	0	0	1	4	11

Draw 2
Thursday, March 5, 10:05

Sheet A	1	2	3	4	5	6	7	8	Final
China (Wang / Yang) 🔨	1	2	0	3	0	3	1	X	10
Latvia (Rožkova / Lasmans)	0	0	1	0	1	0	0	X	2

Draw 3
Thursday, March 5, 19:05

Sheet C	1	2	3	4	5	6	7	8	Final
Latvia (Rožkova / Lasmans)	1	0	1	0	0	1	1	1	5
Great Britain (Butterfield / Kean) 🔨	0	3	0	2	1	0	0	0	6

Draw 4
Friday, March 6, 9:05

Sheet D	1	2	3	4	5	6	7	8	Final
Estonia (Riidebach / Villau) 🔨	0	0	2	0	3	1	0	X	6
Latvia (Rožkova / Lasmans)	1	1	0	3	0	0	4	X	9

Draw 5
Saturday, March 7, 14:35

Sheet C	1	2	3	4	5	6	7	8	Final
Italy (Bertò / Ioriatti) 🔨	2	0	1	0	1	0	0	0	4
Latvia (Rožkova / Lasmans)	0	3	0	2	0	2	1	1	9

Draw 6
Sunday, March 8, 14:35

Sheet B	1	2	3	4	5	6	7	8	Final
Latvia (Rožkova / Lasmans)	0	1	1	0	0	1	0	2	5
South Korea (Baek / Lee) 🔨	1	0	0	1	1	0	1	0	4

Draw 7
Monday, March 9, 14:35

Sheet A	1	2	3	4	5	6	7	8	Final
Latvia (Rožkova / Lasmans)	2	1	2	0	4	0	1	X	10
Japan (Ogawa / Nakajima) 🔨	0	0	0	2	0	2	0	X	4

Semifinal

Tuesday, March 10, 14:35

Sheet A	1	2	3	4	5	6	7	8	Final
China (Wang / Yang) 🔨	2	0	2	2	0	0	2	X	8
Latvia (Rožkova / Lasmans)	0	1	0	0	1	1	0	X	3

Bronze medal

Wednesday, March 11, 14:35

Sheet B	1	2	3	4	5	6	7	8	EE	Final
United States (Dwyer / Emt) 🔨	4	0	0	1	0	4	0	1	0	10
Latvia (Rožkova / Lasmans)	0	5	1	0	1	0	3	0	1	11

== See also ==
- Latvia at the Paralympics
- Latvia at the 2026 Winter Olympics
