= Wheelchair curling at the 2026 Winter Paralympics – Qualification =

The wheelchair curling competition at the 2026 Winter Paralympics will feature a total of 18 teams. There will be 10 teams participating in the mixed team and 8 teams participating in the mixed doubles event. In the mixed team, each team will consist of 5 athletes, while the Mixed Doubles teams will have 2 athletes each. This means that a total of 66 athletes will be competing across all disciplines.

== Summary ==
=== Final summary ===
As the host country of the 2026 Winter Paralympics, Italy will have teams participating in both disciplines of wheelchair curling.

Nations	Mixed team	Mixed doubles	Athletes
Canada	Yes		5
China	Yes	Yes	7
Estonia		Yes	2
Great Britain	Yes	Yes	7
Italy	Yes	Yes	7
Japan		Yes	2
Latvia	Yes	Yes	7
Norway	Yes		5
Slovakia	Yes		5
South Korea	Yes	Yes	7
Sweden	Yes		5
United States	Yes	Yes	7
Total: 12 NPCs	10	8	66

=== Mixed team ===
Means of qualification	Dates	Location	Quotas	Qualified
Host nation	—N/a		1	Italy
Qualification points at the 2023, 2024 & 2025 World Championships	4–12 March 2023	Richmond, Canada	9	Canada; China; Great Britain; Latvia; Norway; Slovakia; South Korea; Sweden; United States
Qualification points at the 2023, 2024 & 2025 World Championships	2–9 March 2024	Gangneung, South Korea	9	Canada; China; Great Britain; Latvia; Norway; Slovakia; South Korea; Sweden; United States
Qualification points at the 2023, 2024 & 2025 World Championships	1–8 March 2025	Stevenston, Scotland	9	Canada; China; Great Britain; Latvia; Norway; Slovakia; South Korea; Sweden; United States
Total			10	

=== Mixed doubles ===
Means of qualification	Dates	Location	Quotas	Qualified
Host nation	—N/a		1	Italy
Qualification points at the 2023, 2024 & 2025 World Championships	4–12 March 2023	Richmond, Canada	7	China; Estonia; Great Britain; Japan; Latvia; South Korea; United States
Qualification points at the 2023, 2024 & 2025 World Championships	11–16 March 2024	Gangneung, South Korea	7	China; Estonia; Great Britain; Japan; Latvia; South Korea; United States
Qualification points at the 2023, 2024 & 2025 World Championships	11–16 March 2025	Stevenston, Scotland	7	China; Estonia; Great Britain; Japan; Latvia; South Korea; United States
Total			8	

== Qualification timeline ==
Event	Date	Venue
2023 World Wheelchair Curling Championship & 2023 World Wheelchair Mixed Doubles Curling Championship	4–12 March 2023	Richmond, British Columbia, Canada
2024 World Wheelchair Curling Championship & 2025 World Wheelchair Mixed Doubles Curling Championship	2–16 March 2023	Gangneung, South Korea
2024 World Wheelchair Curling Championship & 2025 World Wheelchair Mixed Doubles Curling Championship	4–12 March 2023	Stevenston, Scotland

== Qualification system ==
Qualification to the wheelchair curling tournaments at the Winter Paralympics will solely be determined by earning qualification points from performances at the 2023, 2024, and 2025 World Wheelchair Curling Championship & World Wheelchair Mixed Doubles Curling Championship.

In case of a tie in qualification points, the team which finished with higher at the 2025 World Championships will get preference.

=== Qualification points ===
The qualification points are allotted based on the nations' final rankings at the World Wheelchair & World Wheelchair Mixed Doubles Championships. The points are distributed as follows:

Final rank	1	2	3	4	5	6	7	8	9	10	11	12
Points	14	12	10	9	8	7	6	5	4	3	2	1

Note: Scotland, England and Wales all compete separately in international curling. By an agreement between the curling federations of those three home nations, only Scotland can score Paralympic qualification points on behalf of Great Britain.

== Qualification results ==
Key
Nation Qualified for the Paralympic Games as host
Nation Qualified for the Olympic Games via Qualification Points from the 2023, 2024 & 2025 World Championships
Nation Qualified for the 2026 Winter Paralympics

=== Mixed team ===
Country	2023		2024		2025		Total Points	2026 WPG
Country	Place	Points	Place	Points	Place	Points	Total Points	2026 WPG
China	1	14	3	10	1	14	38	
Canada	2	12	2	12	3	10	34	
South Korea	5	8	6	7	2	12	27	
Norway	7	6	1	14	6	7	27	
Sweden	4	9	4	9	5	8	26	
Great Britain	3	10	10	3	7	6	19	
Slovakia	X		7	6	4	9	15	
United States	6	7	9	4	11	2	13	
Latvia	9	4	5	8	12	1	13	
Italy	10	3	8	5	10	3	11	
Czech Republic	8	5	11	2	X		7	
Japan	12	1	X		9	4	5	
Denmark	11	2	X		X		2	
Estonia	X		12	1	X		1	

=== Mixed doubles ===
Country	2023		2024		2025		Total Points	2026 WPG
Country	Place	Points	Place	Points	Place	Points	Total Points	2026 WPG
South Korea	7	6	1	14	4	9	29	
United States	2	12	5	8	9	4	24	
China	4	9	2	12	10	3	24	
Japan	13	0	4	9	1	14	23	
Latvia	1	14	7	6	11	2	22	
Great Britain	8	5	10	3	2	12	20	
Estonia	9	4	8	5	3	10	19	
Slovakia	6	7	6	7	8	5	19	
Canada	3	10	17	0	6	7	17	
Italy	12	1	3	10	16	0	11	
Norway	14	0	14	0	5	8	8	
Czech Republic	X		X		7	6	6	
Germany	10	3	X		X		3	
Hungary	11	2	16	0	13	0	2	
Finland	19	0	11	2	17	0	2	
Denmark	18	0	12	1	15	0	1	
Switzerland	16	0	15	0	14	0	0	
Turkey	X		18	0	18	0	0	
Poland	17	0	19	0	19	0	0	
Brazil	X		X		20	0	0	
Spain	X		20	0	21	0	0	
Sweden	15	0	13	0	X		0	
Slovenia	X		21	0	X		0	

Note: Scotland, England and Wales compete separately at international level in curling. By an agreement between the curling federations of those three nations, only Scotland can score Olympic qualification points on behalf of Great Britain.
