= Cha Jin-ho =

South Korean wheelchair curler

- Curler ♂

Curling career
- Member Association: South Korea
- World Wheelchair Championship: 2 (2019, 2025)
- Paralympic: 1 (2026)
Medal record
Wheelchair curling
World Wheelchair Championship
Silver medal – second place	2025 Stevenston
Bronze medal – third place	2019 Sterling

Cha Jin-ho (Korean: 차진호) is a South Korean wheelchair curler.

== Teams ==
Season	Skip	Third	Second	Lead	Alternate	Coach	Events
2018–19	Yang Hui-tae (fourth)	Seo Soon-seok	Cha Jin-ho (skip)	Bang Min-ja	Min Byeong-seok	Beak Jong-chul, Kim Seok-hyun	WWhCC 2019 (bronze)
2024–25	Lee Hyeon-chul	Nam Bong-kwang	Yang Hui-tae	Yun Hee-kyeong	Cha Jin-ho	Cho Yang-hyun	WWhCC 2025 (silver)
