= Norway at the 2026 Winter Paralympics =

- Flag of Norway
- IPC code: NOR

in Milan & Cortina d'Ampezzo, Italy 6 March 2026 – 15 March 2026
- Medals Ranked 12th: Gold 2 Silver 4 Bronze 2 Total 8

Winter Paralympics appearances (overview)
- 1976; 1980; 1984; 1988; 1992; 1994; 1998; 2002; 2006; 2010; 2014; 2018; 2022; 2026

Norway will compete at the 2026 Winter Paralympics in Milan and Cortina d'Ampezzo, Italy, which will take place between 6–15 March 2026.

== Medallists ==
Medal	Name	Sport	Event	Date
Gold	Jesper Pedersen	Para alpine skiing	Men's downhill, sitting	7 March
Gold	Vilde Nilsen	Para cross-country skiing	Women's sprint classical, standing	10 March
Silver	Jesper Pedersen	Para alpine skiing	Men's super-G, sitting	9 March
Silver	Vilde Nilsen	Para cross-country skiing	Women's 10 kilometre classical, standing	11 March
Silver	Vilde Nilsen	Para cross-country skiing	Women's 20 kilometre freestyle, standing	15 March
Silver	Jesper Pedersen	Para alpine skiing	Men's slalom, sitting	15 March
Bronze	Jesper Pedersen	Para alpine skiing	Men's giant slalom, sitting	13 March
Bronze	Kjartan Haugen; Vilde Nilsen; Thomas Oxaal; Guide: Geir Lervik	Para cross-country skiing	Open 4 × 2.5 kilometre relay	14 March

Medals by sport
Sport	1st place, gold medalist(s)	2nd place, silver medalist(s)	3rd place, bronze medalist(s)	Total
Para alpine skiing	1	2	1	4
Para cross-country skiing	1	2	1	4
Total	2	4	2	8

Medals by date
Day	Date	1st place, gold medalist(s)	2nd place, silver medalist(s)	3rd place, bronze medalist(s)	Total
Day 1	7 March	1	0	0	1
Day 3	9 March	0	1	0	1
Day 4	10 March	1	0	0	1
Day 5	11 March	0	1	0	1
Day 7	13 March	0	0	1	1
Day 8	14 March	0	0	1	1
Day 9	15 March	0	2	0	2
Total		2	4	2	8

Medals by gender
Gender	1st place, gold medalist(s)	2nd place, silver medalist(s)	3rd place, bronze medalist(s)	Total
Female	1	2	0	3
Male	1	2	1	4
Mixed	0	0	1	1
Total	2	4	2	8

== Competitors ==
The following is the list of number of competitors participating at the Games per sport/discipline.

- Marcus Grasto Nilsson
- Indira Liseth

Norway is sending one wheelchair curling team to the 2026 Winter Paralympics. The team includes Jostein Stordahl (fourth), Geir Arne Skogstad (skip and third), Ole Fredrik Syversen (second), and Mia Larsen Sveberg (lead), with Ingrid Djupskaas as alternate.

Sport	Men	Women	Total
Wheelchair curling	3	2	5
Total	3	2	5

== Wheelchair curling ==
Summary

Team	Event	Group stage										Semifinal	Final / BM	
Team	Event	Opposition Score	Opposition Score	Opposition Score	Opposition Score	Opposition Score	Opposition Score	Opposition Score	Opposition Score	Opposition Score	Rank	Opposition Score	Opposition Score	Rank
Jostein Stordahl; Geir Arne Skogstad; Ole Fredrik Syversen; Mia Larsen Sveberg; Ingrid Djupskaas	Mixed team	SWE; L 2–6	SVK; L 4–6	CAN; L 2–9	CHN; L 2–11	KOR; L 0–9	ITA; W 9–3	LAT; W 6–5	USA; W 7–4	GBR; W 9–2	5	Did not advance		

=== Mixed tournament ===
Final Round Robin Standings
Team	Skip	Pld	W	L	W–L	PF	PA	EW	EL	BE	SE	S%	DSC	Qualification
Canada	Mark Ideson	9	9	0	–	71	36	36	26	2	19	68.2%	84.488	Playoffs
China	Wang Haitao	9	8	1	–	76	42	38	26	1	15	68.3%	83.350	Playoffs
Sweden	Viljo Petersson-Dahl	9	5	4	1–0	47	48	31	31	6	13	62.8%	98.125	Playoffs
South Korea	Yang Hui-tae	9	5	4	0–1	55	48	36	32	1	17	64.6%	90.525	Playoffs
Norway	Jostein Stordahl	9	4	5	1–0	41	55	28	31	2	12	58.3%	130.863	
Italy	Egidio Marchese	9	4	5	0–1	52	53	32	27	0	15	60.6%	107.831	
Latvia	Ojārs Briedis	9	3	6	2–0	45	67	27	33	0	12	50.2%	113.381	
Slovakia	Radoslav Ďuriš	9	3	6	1–1	42	56	26	37	1	13	51.9%	117.688	
United States	Sean O'Neill	9	3	6	0–2	54	52	34	32	0	14	58.3%	72.156	
Great Britain	Hugh Nibloe	9	1	8	–	40	66	26	39	0	7	55.7%	129.675	

Source: Official website

Round robin
Norway had a bye in draws 2, 5 and 10.

Draw 1
Saturday, March 7, 9:35

Sheet D	1	2	3	4	5	6	7	8	Final
Norway (Stordahl)	0	0	1	0	1	0	0	X	2
Sweden (Petersson-Dahl) 🔨	1	1	0	3	0	0	1	X	6

Draw 3
Sunday, March 8, 9:35

Sheet C	1	2	3	4	5	6	7	8	Final
Slovakia (Ďuriš)	0	0	0	0	0	0	2	4	6
Norway (Stordahl) 🔨	0	1	1	1	0	1	0	0	4

Draw 4
Sunday, March 8, 18:35

Sheet B	1	2	3	4	5	6	7	8	Final
Canada (Ideson) 🔨	1	0	0	2	0	6	X	X	9
Norway (Stordahl)	0	1	0	0	1	0	X	X	2

Draw 6
Monday, March 9, 18:35

Sheet A	1	2	3	4	5	6	7	8	Final
Norway (Stordahl) 🔨	0	0	0	1	0	1	0	X	2
China (Wang)	1	1	2	0	2	0	5	X	11

Draw 7
Tuesday, March 10, 9:35

Sheet D	1	2	3	4	5	6	7	8	Final
South Korea (Yang)	1	1	2	2	1	1	1	X	9
Norway (Stordahl) 🔨	0	0	0	0	0	0	0	X	0

Draw 8
Tuesday, March 10, 18:35

Sheet C	1	2	3	4	5	6	7	8	Final
Italy (Marchese)	0	0	1	0	2	0	0	X	3
Norway (Stordahl) 🔨	2	3	0	3	0	0	1	X	9

Draw 9
Wednesday, March 11, 9:05

Sheet A	1	2	3	4	5	6	7	8	Final
Latvia (Briedis)	0	0	0	1	0	3	1	0	5
Norway (Stordahl) 🔨	1	1	1	0	1	0	0	2	6

Draw 11
Thursday, March 12, 13:35

Sheet C	1	2	3	4	5	6	7	8	Final
Norway (Stordahl)	1	2	0	1	0	0	0	3	7
United States (O'Neill) 🔨	0	0	1	0	1	1	1	0	4

Draw 12
Thursday, March 12, 18:35

Sheet B	1	2	3	4	5	6	7	8	Final
Norway (Stordahl)	0	1	1	1	3	3	X	X	9
Great Britain (Nibloe) 🔨	2	0	0	0	0	0	X	X	2

== See also ==
- Norway at the Paralympics
- Norway at the 2026 Winter Olympics
