= Wheelchair curling at the 2026 Winter Paralympics =

Wheelchair curling at the XIV Paralympic Winter Games
- Venue: Stadio Olimpico del Ghiaccio
- Dates: 4–14 March
- Competitors: 66 from 12 nations

The wheelchair curling competitions of the 2026 Winter Paralympics were held from 4 to 14 March 2026 in the Stadio Olimpico del Ghiaccio in Cortina d'Ampezzo, Italy. For the first time, a mixed doubles event will be contested.

Before the first competition day, two curling stones were missing from the venue; local Italian authorities were said to be investigating the situation.

== Medal summary ==
=== Medal table ===
The ranking in the table is based on information provided by the International Paralympic Committee (IPC) and will be consistent with IPC convention in its published medal tables. By default, the table will be ordered by the number of gold medals the athletes from a nation have won (in this context, a "nation" is an entity represented by a National Paralympic Committee). The number of silver medals is taken into consideration next and then the number of bronze medals. If nations are still tied, equal ranking is given and they are listed alphabetically by IPC country code.

* Host nation (Italy)

Rank	Nation	Gold	Silver	Bronze	Total
1	China	1	1	0	2
2	Canada	1	0	0	1
3	South Korea	0	1	0	1
4	Latvia	0	0	1	1
4	Sweden	0	0	1	1
Totals (5 entries)		2	2	2	6

=== Events ===
Event	Gold	Silver	Bronze
Mixed team	Canada; Mark Ideson; Jon Thurston; Ina Forrest; Collinda Joseph; Gil Dash	China; Wang Haitao; Chen Jianxin; Zhang Mingliang; Li Nana; Zhang Qiang	Sweden; Viljo Petersson-Dahl; Ronny Persson; Sabina Johansson; Kristina Ulander; Marcus Holm
Mixed doubles	China; Wang Meng; Yang Jinqiao	South Korea; Baek Hye-jin; Lee Yong-suk	Latvia; Poļina Rožkova; Agris Lasmans

== Qualification ==
Qualification for the 2026 Winter Paralympics was based on rankings in the 2023, 2024, and 2025 World Wheelchair Curling Championships.

=== Summary ===
As the host country of the 2026 Winter Paralympics, Italy will have teams participating in both disciplines of wheelchair curling.

Nations	Mixed team	Mixed doubles	Athletes
Canada	Yes		5
China	Yes	Yes	7
Estonia		Yes	2
Great Britain	Yes	Yes	7
Italy	Yes	Yes	7
Japan		Yes	2
Latvia	Yes	Yes	7
Norway	Yes		5
Slovakia	Yes		5
South Korea	Yes	Yes	7
Sweden	Yes		5
United States	Yes	Yes	7
Total: 12 NPCs	10	8	66

=== Mixed team ===
Means of qualification	Dates	Location	Quotas	Qualified
Host nation	—N/a		1	Italy
Qualification points at the 2023, 2024 & 2025 World Championships	4–12 March 2023	Richmond, Canada	9	Canada; China; Great Britain; Latvia; Norway; Slovakia; South Korea; Sweden; United States
Qualification points at the 2023, 2024 & 2025 World Championships	2–9 March 2024	Gangneung, South Korea	9	Canada; China; Great Britain; Latvia; Norway; Slovakia; South Korea; Sweden; United States
Qualification points at the 2023, 2024 & 2025 World Championships	1–8 March 2025	(United Kingdom) Stevenston, Great Britain	9	Canada; China; Great Britain; Latvia; Norway; Slovakia; South Korea; Sweden; United States
Total			10	

=== Mixed doubles ===
Means of qualification	Dates	Location	Quotas	Qualified
Host nation	—N/a		1	Italy
Qualification points at the 2023, 2024 & 2025 World Championships	4–12 March 2023	Richmond, Canada	7	China; Estonia; Great Britain; Japan; Latvia; South Korea; United States
Qualification points at the 2023, 2024 & 2025 World Championships	11–16 March 2024	Gangneung, South Korea	7	China; Estonia; Great Britain; Japan; Latvia; South Korea; United States
Qualification points at the 2023, 2024 & 2025 World Championships	11–16 March 2025	(United Kingdom) Stevenston, Great Britain	7	China; Estonia; Great Britain; Japan; Latvia; South Korea; United States
Total			8	

== Teams ==
The teams are listed as follows:

=== Mixed team ===
Canada	China	Great Britain	Italy	Latvia
Skip: Mark Ideson; Third: Jon Thurston; Second: Ina Forrest; Lead: Collinda Joseph; Alternate: Gil Dash	Skip: Wang Haitao; Third: Chen Jianxin; Second: Zhang Mingliang; Lead: Li Nana; Alternate: Zhang Qiang	Skip: Hugh Nibloe; Third: Stewart Pimblett; Second: Austin McKenzie; Lead: Karen Aspey; Alternate: Graeme Stewart	Skip: Egidio Marchese; Third: Fabrizio Bich; Second: Matteo Ronzani; Lead: Angela Menardi; Alternate: Giuliana Turra	Fourth: Sergejs Djačenko; Skip: Ojārs Briedis; Second: Linda Meijere; Lead: Adelaida Killiane; Alternate: Elija Asniņa
Norway	Slovakia	South Korea	Sweden	United States
Skip: Jostein Stordahl; Third: Geir Arne Skogstad; Second: Ole Fredrik Syversen; Lead: Mia Larsen Sveberg; Alternate: Ingrid Djupskaas	Fourth: Peter Zaťko; Skip: Radoslav Ďuriš; Second: Adrián Ďurček; Lead: Monika Kunkelová; Alternate: Karol Šandl	Skip: Yang Hui-tae; Third: Lee Hyeon-chul; Second: Nam Bong-kwang; Lead: Bang Min-ja; Alternate: Cha Jin-ho	Skip: Viljo Petersson-Dahl; Third: Ronny Persson; Second: Sabina Johansson; Lead: Kristina Ulander; Alternate: Marcus Holm	Fourth: Matthew Thums; Skip: Sean O'Neill; Second: Daniel Rose; Lead: Batoyun Uranchimeg; Alternate: Kathleen Verderber

=== Mixed doubles ===
China	Estonia	Great Britain	Italy
Female: Wang Meng; Male: Yang Jinqiao	Female: Katlin Riidebach; Male: Ain Villau	Female: Jo Butterfield; Male: Jason Kean	Female: Orietta Bertò; Male: Paolo Ioriatti
Japan	Latvia	South Korea	United States
Female: Aki Ogawa; Male: Yoji Nakajima	Female: Poļina Rožkova; Male: Agris Lasmans	Female: Baek Hye-jin; Male: Lee Yong-suk	Female: Laura Dwyer; Male: Stephen Emt

== Mixed team ==
=== Round robin standings ===
Final Round Robin Standings
Team	Skip	Pld	W	L	W–L	PF	PA	EW	EL	BE	SE	S%	DSC	Qualification
Canada	Mark Ideson	9	9	0	–	71	36	36	26	2	19	68.2%	84.488	Playoffs
China	Wang Haitao	9	8	1	–	76	42	38	26	1	15	68.3%	83.350	Playoffs
Sweden	Viljo Petersson-Dahl	9	5	4	1–0	47	48	31	31	6	13	62.8%	98.125	Playoffs
South Korea	Yang Hui-tae	9	5	4	0–1	55	48	36	32	1	17	64.6%	90.525	Playoffs
Norway	Jostein Stordahl	9	4	5	1–0	41	55	28	31	2	12	58.3%	130.863	
Italy	Egidio Marchese	9	4	5	0–1	52	53	32	27	0	15	60.6%	107.831	
Latvia	Ojārs Briedis	9	3	6	2–0	45	67	27	33	0	12	50.2%	113.381	
Slovakia	Radoslav Ďuriš	9	3	6	1–1	42	56	26	37	1	13	51.9%	117.688	
United States	Sean O'Neill	9	3	6	0–2	54	52	34	32	0	14	58.3%	72.156	
Great Britain	Hugh Nibloe	9	1	8	–	40	66	26	39	0	7	55.7%	129.675	

Source: Official website

Mixed team round robin summary table
Pos.	Country	Canada	China	Great Britain	Italy	Latvia	Norway	Slovakia	South Korea	Sweden	United States	Record
1	Canada	—N/a	9–4	5–4	9–8	11–1	9–2	9–6	6–3	6–5	7–3	9–0
2	China	4–9	—N/a	9–4	5–3	9–5	11–2	7–4	7–5	12–3	12–7	8–1
10	Great Britain	4–5	4–9	—N/a	6–8	5–8	2–9	2–9	6–7	5–6	6–5	1–8
6	Italy	8–9	3–5	8–6	—N/a	10–5	3–9	10–0	5–6	4–3	1–10	4–5
7	Latvia	1–11	5–9	8–5	5–10	—N/a	5–6	9–0	2–10	2–10	8–6	3–6
5	Norway	2–9	2–11	9–2	9–3	6–5	—N/a	4–6	0–9	2–6	7–4	4–5
8	Slovakia	6–9	4–7	9–2	0–10	0–9	6–4	—N/a	5–7	4–5	8–3	3–6
4	South Korea	3–6	5–7	7–6	6–5	10–2	9–0	7–5	—N/a	6–8	2–9	5–4
3	Sweden	5–6	12–3	6–5	3–4	10–2	6–2	5–4	8–6	—N/a	1–7	5–4
9	United States	3–7	7–12	5–6	10–1	6–8	4–7	3–8	9–2	7–1	—N/a	3–6

=== Round robin results ===
All draw times are listed in Central European Time (UTC+01:00).

==== Draw 1 ====
Saturday, March 7, 9:35

Sheet A	1	2	3	4	5	6	7	8	Final
Great Britain (Nibloe)	0	0	2	0	0	0	0	X	2
Slovakia (Ďuriš) 🔨	1	1	0	1	4	1	1	X	9

Sheet B	1	2	3	4	5	6	7	8	Final
South Korea (Yang) 🔨	5	1	0	1	0	3	X	X	10
Latvia (Briedis)	0	0	1	0	1	0	X	X	2

Sheet C	1	2	3	4	5	6	7	8	Final
United States (O'Neill) 🔨	2	0	3	0	0	2	0	0	7
China (Wang)	0	4	0	4	1	0	1	2	12

Sheet D	1	2	3	4	5	6	7	8	Final
Norway (Stordahl)	0	0	1	0	1	0	0	X	2
Sweden (Petersson-Dahl) 🔨	1	1	0	3	0	0	1	X	6

==== Draw 2 ====
Saturday, March 7, 18:35

Sheet A	1	2	3	4	5	6	7	8	Final
Italy (Marchese) 🔨	0	2	0	0	2	2	1	1	8
Canada (Ideson)	4	0	3	2	0	0	0	0	9

Sheet B	1	2	3	4	5	6	7	8	EE	Final
United States (O'Neill) 🔨	1	0	2	0	0	1	0	1	0	5
Great Britain (Nibloe)	0	2	0	1	1	0	1	0	1	6

Sheet C	1	2	3	4	5	6	7	8	EE	Final
Sweden (Petersson-Dahl) 🔨	0	2	0	2	0	1	1	0	2	8
South Korea (Yang)	1	0	3	0	1	0	0	1	0	6

Sheet D	1	2	3	4	5	6	7	8	Final
Latvia (Briedis)	2	1	1	1	2	2	X	X	9
Slovakia (Ďuriš) 🔨	0	0	0	0	0	0	X	X	0

==== Draw 3 ====
Sunday, March 8, 9:35

Sheet A	1	2	3	4	5	6	7	8	Final
Sweden (Petersson-Dahl)	1	4	3	0	2	0	X	X	10
Latvia (Briedis) 🔨	0	0	0	1	0	1	X	X	2

Sheet B	1	2	3	4	5	6	7	8	Final
Italy (Marchese)	0	1	0	0	0	0	2	X	3
China (Wang) 🔨	1	0	1	1	1	1	0	X	5

Sheet C	1	2	3	4	5	6	7	8	Final
Slovakia (Ďuriš)	0	0	0	0	0	0	2	4	6
Norway (Stordahl) 🔨	0	1	1	1	0	1	0	0	4

Sheet D	1	2	3	4	5	6	7	8	Final
Canada (Ideson) 🔨	0	0	1	1	0	0	0	3	5
Great Britain (Nibloe)	0	1	0	0	1	1	1	0	4

==== Draw 4 ====
Sunday, March 8, 18:35

Sheet A	1	2	3	4	5	6	7	8	Final
United States (O'Neill) 🔨	3	0	4	1	1	1	X	X	10
Italy (Marchese)	0	1	0	0	0	0	X	X	1

Sheet B	1	2	3	4	5	6	7	8	Final
Canada (Ideson) 🔨	1	0	0	2	0	6	X	X	9
Norway (Stordahl)	0	1	0	0	1	0	X	X	2

Sheet D	1	2	3	4	5	6	7	8	Final
China (Wang)	1	0	2	0	2	0	1	1	7
South Korea (Yang) 🔨	0	1	0	2	0	2	0	0	5

==== Draw 5 ====
Monday, March 9, 9:35

Sheet A	1	2	3	4	5	6	7	8	Final
South Korea (Yang)	1	2	0	0	0	2	0	2	7
Great Britain (Nibloe) 🔨	0	0	1	2	1	0	2	0	6

Sheet B	1	2	3	4	5	6	7	8	Final
Sweden (Petersson-Dahl)	0	0	0	0	1	0	0	X	1
United States (O'Neill) 🔨	2	1	1	1	0	1	1	X	7

Sheet C	1	2	3	4	5	6	7	8	Final
Canada (Ideson)	3	1	1	4	2	0	X	X	11
Latvia (Briedis) 🔨	0	0	0	0	0	1	X	X	1

Sheet D	1	2	3	4	5	6	7	8	Final
Slovakia (Ďuriš)	0	0	0	0	0	0	X	X	0
Italy (Marchese) 🔨	2	2	2	1	2	1	X	X	10

==== Draw 6 ====
Monday, March 9, 18:35

Sheet A	1	2	3	4	5	6	7	8	Final
Norway (Stordahl) 🔨	0	0	0	1	0	1	0	X	2
China (Wang)	1	1	2	0	2	0	5	X	11

Sheet B	1	2	3	4	5	6	7	8	Final
South Korea (Yang) 🔨	0	2	1	1	0	1	2	0	7
Slovakia (Ďuriš)	1	0	0	0	2	0	0	2	5

Sheet C	1	2	3	4	5	6	7	8	Final
Great Britain (Nibloe)	0	2	0	0	0	3	0	0	5
Sweden (Petersson-Dahl) 🔨	1	0	0	1	1	0	2	1	6

Sheet D	1	2	3	4	5	6	7	8	Final
United States (O'Neill) 🔨	0	0	0	0	1	2	3	X	6
Latvia (Briedis)	2	2	1	3	0	0	0	X	8

==== Draw 7 ====
Tuesday, March 10, 9:35

Sheet B	1	2	3	4	5	6	7	8	Final
Great Britain (Nibloe) 🔨	0	3	0	0	2	0	1	X	6
Italy (Marchese)	1	0	1	3	0	3	0	X	8

Sheet C	1	2	3	4	5	6	7	8	Final
China (Wang)	0	0	0	3	0	1	0	X	4
Canada (Ideson) 🔨	2	0	1	0	2	0	4	X	9

Sheet D	1	2	3	4	5	6	7	8	Final
South Korea (Yang)	1	1	2	2	1	1	1	X	9
Norway (Stordahl) 🔨	0	0	0	0	0	0	0	X	0

==== Draw 8 ====
Tuesday, March 10, 18:35

Sheet A	1	2	3	4	5	6	7	8	Final
Slovakia (Ďuriš) 🔨	2	1	1	0	3	0	1	X	8
United States (O'Neill)	0	0	0	2	0	1	0	X	3

Sheet B	1	2	3	4	5	6	7	8	Final
Latvia (Briedis)	0	0	1	0	1	0	3	X	5
China (Wang) 🔨	1	2	0	3	0	3	0	X	9

Sheet C	1	2	3	4	5	6	7	8	Final
Italy (Marchese)	0	0	1	0	2	0	0	X	3
Norway (Stordahl) 🔨	2	3	0	3	0	0	1	X	9

Sheet D	1	2	3	4	5	6	7	8	Final
Sweden (Petersson-Dahl)	0	0	0	0	1	1	3	0	5
Canada (Ideson) 🔨	1	1	0	1	0	0	0	3	6

==== Draw 9 ====
Wednesday, March 11, 9:05

Sheet A	1	2	3	4	5	6	7	8	Final
Latvia (Briedis)	0	0	0	1	0	3	1	0	5
Norway (Stordahl) 🔨	1	1	1	0	1	0	0	2	6

Sheet B	1	2	3	4	5	6	7	8	Final
United States (O'Neill) 🔨	0	3	1	3	0	1	1	X	9
South Korea (Yang)	1	0	0	0	1	0	0	X	2

Sheet C	1	2	3	4	5	6	7	8	Final
Sweden (Petersson-Dahl)	1	1	1	1	0	0	1	0	5
Slovakia (Ďuriš) 🔨	0	0	0	0	1	1	0	2	4

Sheet D	1	2	3	4	5	6	7	8	Final
Great Britain (Nibloe)	0	2	1	0	1	0	0	X	4
China (Wang) 🔨	3	0	0	1	0	2	3	X	9

==== Draw 10 ====
Wednesday, March 11, 20:05

Sheet A	1	2	3	4	5	6	7	8	Final
Italy (Marchese)	0	1	1	0	0	1	0	1	4
Sweden (Petersson-Dahl) 🔨	0	0	0	0	3	0	0	0	3

Sheet B	1	2	3	4	5	6	7	8	Final
Slovakia (Ďuriš)	0	0	2	1	1	2	0	0	6
Canada (Ideson) 🔨	2	4	0	0	0	0	1	2	9

Sheet C	1	2	3	4	5	6	7	8	Final
Latvia (Briedis) 🔨	4	0	1	0	1	2	0	X	8
Great Britain (Nibloe)	0	2	0	2	0	0	1	X	5

==== Draw 11 ====
Thursday, March 12, 13:35

Sheet A	1	2	3	4	5	6	7	8	Final
Canada (Ideson)	1	1	0	2	0	0	1	1	6
South Korea (Yang) 🔨	0	0	1	0	1	1	0	0	3

Sheet B	1	2	3	4	5	6	7	8	Final
China (Wang)	0	4	0	6	1	0	1	X	12
Sweden (Petersson-Dahl) 🔨	1	0	1	0	0	1	0	X	3

Sheet C	1	2	3	4	5	6	7	8	Final
Norway (Stordahl)	1	2	0	1	0	0	0	3	7
United States (O'Neill) 🔨	0	0	1	0	1	1	1	0	4

Sheet D	1	2	3	4	5	6	7	8	Final
Italy (Marchese) 🔨	2	0	1	0	2	3	2	X	10
Latvia (Briedis)	0	3	0	2	0	0	0	X	5

==== Draw 12 ====
Thursday, March 12, 18:35

Sheet A	1	2	3	4	5	6	7	8	Final
China (Wang)	1	0	2	0	0	3	1	X	7
Slovakia (Ďuriš) 🔨	0	1	0	2	1	0	0	X	4

Sheet B	1	2	3	4	5	6	7	8	Final
Norway (Stordahl)	0	1	1	1	3	3	X	X	9
Great Britain (Nibloe) 🔨	2	0	0	0	0	0	X	X	2

Sheet C	1	2	3	4	5	6	7	8	Final
South Korea (Yang)	0	3	0	0	1	1	0	1	6
Italy (Marchese) 🔨	2	0	2	0	0	0	1	0	5

Sheet D	1	2	3	4	5	6	7	8	Final
Canada (Ideson)	0	2	1	0	1	2	1	X	7
United States (O'Neill) 🔨	2	0	0	1	0	0	0	X	3

=== Playoffs ===
Semifinals
1	Canada	8
4	South Korea	7
2	China	7
3	Sweden	6

Gold medal game
1	Canada	4
2	China	3
Bronze medal game
4	South Korea	4
3	Sweden	7

==== Semifinals ====
Friday, March 13, 10:05

Sheet B	1	2	3	4	5	6	7	8	Final
Canada (Ideson) 🔨	2	0	0	1	1	0	1	3	8
South Korea (Yang)	0	2	2	0	0	3	0	0	7

Sheet D	1	2	3	4	5	6	7	8	Final
China (Wang) 🔨	1	1	0	1	0	3	0	1	7
Sweden (Petersson-Dahl)	0	0	3	0	1	0	2	0	6

==== Bronze medal game ====
Friday, March 13, 18:35

Sheet C	1	2	3	4	5	6	7	8	Final
South Korea (Yang)	0	0	2	0	0	0	2	0	4
Sweden (Petersson-Dahl) 🔨	0	1	0	2	0	2	0	2	7

==== Gold medal game ====
Saturday, March 14, 15:05

Sheet C	1	2	3	4	5	6	7	8	Final
Canada (Ideson) 🔨	0	1	0	1	0	1	0	1	4
China (Wang)	0	0	1	0	1	0	1	0	3

=== Final standings ===
The final standings are:

Place	Team
1st place, gold medalist(s)	Canada
2nd place, silver medalist(s)	China
3rd place, bronze medalist(s)	Sweden
4	South Korea
5	Norway
6	Italy
7	Latvia
8	Slovakia
9	United States
10	Great Britain

=== Statistics ===
==== Player percentages ====
Percentages by draw.

===== Lead =====
#	Curler	1	2	3	4	5	6	7	8	9	Total
1	Batoyun Uranchimeg (USA)	73	79	84	67	80	69	82	77	55	73.7
2	Bang Min-ja (KOR)	83	74	70	70	67	77	77	78	64	73.0
3	Collinda Joseph (CAN)	58	61	81	–	84	77	–	80	72	72.6
4	Angela Menardi (ITA)	80	63	71	69	71	61	84	77	70	71.8
5	Li Nana (CHN)	79	66	58	68	68	71	71	77	73	69.8
6	Kristina Ulander (SWE)	80	58	67	82	81	67	70	55	70	69.7
7	Mia Larsen Sveberg (NOR)	61	–	50	70	64	–	53	–	67	60.7
8	Adelaida Killiane (LAT)	–	–	–	75	–	56	–	–	–	60.0
9	Monika Kunkelová (SVK)	45	63	56	60	64	52	53	66	75	59.4
10	Karen Aspey (GBR)	66	66	73	34	48	50	80	39	69	57.8

===== Second =====
#	Curler	1	2	3	4	5	6	7	8	9	Total
1	Zhang Mingliang (CHN)	73	80	69	84 (3)	86 (3)	60 (3)	59 (3)	79 (3)	61 (3)	72.0
2	Ina Forrest (CAN)	66	56	67	90	89	70	56	67	55	67.5
3	Nam Bong-kwang (KOR)	58	67	–	59	58	–	71	72	56 (3)	63.2
4	Ole Fredrik Syversen (NOR)	70	56	81	70	46	67	56	61	63	63.1
5	Matteo Ronzani (ITA)	58	61	44	58	64	41	58	68	52	56.1
6	Sabina Johansson (SWE)	70	56	–	57	39	–	–	–	54	55.1
7	Austin McKenzie (GBR)	41	49	69	64	44	38	61	55	56	53.5
8	Daniel Rose (USA)	56	44	50	56	34	45	83	52	56 (3)	53.2
9	Adrián Ďurček (SVK)	52	29	53	31	52 (4)	75 (4)	50 (4)	45 (4)	54 (4)	49.6
10	Linda Meijere (LAT)	48 (3)	42 (3)	48 (3)	48 (3)	38 (4)	52 (4)	41 (3)	44	55	46.0

===== Third =====
#	Curler	1	2	3	4	5	6	7	8	9	Total
1	Jon Thurston (CAN)	66	56	67	81	73	86	73	75	83	73.3
2	Chen Jianxin (CHN)	58	63	46	71 (2)	64 (2)	–	66 (2)	73 (2)	69 (2)	65.0
3	Sean O'Neill (USA)	70	43	92	79	33	80	71 (4)	47 (4)	47	61.5
4	Lee Hyeon-chul (KOR)	63	54	67	66	67 (4)	84	48	53	48 (4)	60.9
5	Fabrizio Bich (ITA)	48	63	56	71	63	50	52	57	44	55.5
6	Geir Arne Skogstad (NOR)	44	59	54	50	34	73 (4)	56	63	65	55.2
7	Stewart Pimblett (GBR)	57	58	61	61	70	61	50 (4)	39 (4)	25 (4)	54.5
8	Ojārs Briedis (LAT)	56 (2)	42 (2)	48 (2)	65 (2)	58 (2)	69 (2)	34 (2)	56	43	52.4
9	Ronny Persson (SWE)	58	–	35	–	63	52	47	59	38	51.8
10	Radoslav Ďuriš (SVK)	46	63	67	48	48	46	45	55	38	50.6

===== Fourth =====
#	Curler	1	2	3	4	5	6	7	8	9	Total
1	Viljo Petersson-Dahl (SWE)	70	79	88	52	61	72	72	55	64	68.0
2	Wang Haitao (CHN)	59	53	80	77	52	57	70	91	65	67.0
3	Mark Ideson (CAN)	50	60	81	60	71	59	38	72	72	61.9
4	Yang Hui-tae (KOR)	60	60	59	70	67 (3)	61	44	31	–	59.3
5	Egidio Marchese (ITA)	64	47	42	90	62	55	53	64	58	59.0
6	Hugh Nibloe (GBR)	34	56	56	31	70	61	57 (3)	55 (3)	54 (3)	55.0
7	Jostein Stordahl (NOR)	52	62	54	41	13	72 (3)	42	63	71	53.8
8	Peter Zaťko (SVK)	63	27	59	25	–	–	–	–	–	47.0
9	Matthew Thums (USA)	44	46	58	52	23	30	66 (3)	59 (3)	46	46.8
10	Sergejs Djačenko (LAT)	43	58	38	27	31 (3)	59 (3)	45	47	46	43.8

===== Alternate =====
#	Curler	1	2	3	4	5	6	7	8	9	Total
1	Cha Jin-ho (KOR)	–	–	67 (2)	–	–	66 (2)	75 (2)	78 (2)	55 (2)	65.8
2	Graeme Stewart (GBR)	–	–	–	46 (2)	–	81 (2)	–	–	72 (2)	63.4
3	Marcus Holm (SWE)	–	61 (3)	56 (2)	61 (3)	–	67 (2)	61 (2)	78 (2)	50 (2)	62.5
4	Zhang Qiang (CHN)	–	–	53 (2)	–	–	67 (2)	–	–	–	61.5
5	Ingrid Djupskaas (NOR)	–	69 (1)	–	–	33 (2)	46 (1)	–	73 (1)	–	60.1
6	Gil Dash (CAN)	–	–	–	58 (1)	–	–	59 (1)	–	–	58.9
7	Elija Asniņa (LAT)	69 (1)	52 (1)	50 (1)	60 (1)	64 (1)	59 (1)	55 (1)	53 (1)	61 (1)	58.1
8	Karol Šandl (SVK)	–	–	–	50 (2)	59 (2)	30 (2)	48 (2)	50 (2)	55 (2)	48.5
9	Kathleen Verderber (USA)	–	–	50 (2)	–	47 (2)	–	–	–	42 (2)	44.4

===== Team total =====
#	Team	1	2	3	4	5	6	7	8	9	Total
1	China	67	65	64	75	67	64	67	80	67	68.3
2	Canada	60	58	74	72	79	73	57	73	70	68.2
3	South Korea	66	64	66	66	65	72	63	64	56	64.6
4	Sweden	69	64	61	63	61	64	63	62	57	62.8
5	Italy	63	58	53	72	65	52	62	67	56	60.6
6	Norway	57	62	60	58	42	65	52	65	66	58.3
6	United States	61	53	71	63	44	56	75	59	49	58.3
8	Great Britain	50	57	65	50	58	58	62	47	54	55.7
9	Slovakia	51	45	59	43	56	50	49	54	55	51.9
10	Latvia	54	48	46	51	48	59	44	50	52	50.2

== Mixed doubles ==
=== Round robin standings ===
Final Round Robin Standings
Team	Athletes	Pld	W	L	W–L	PF	PA	EW	EL	BE	SE	S%	DSC	Qualification
China	Wang Meng / Yang Jinqiao	7	6	1	–	66	32	32	21	0	14	64.9%	106.033	Playoffs
United States	Laura Dwyer / Steve Emt	7	4	3	1–1	43	43	25	27	0	9	53.4%	89.717	Playoffs
South Korea	Baek Hye-jin / Lee Yong-suk	7	4	3	1–1	58	26	30	19	0	17	59.9%	142.058	Playoffs
Latvia	Poļina Rožkova / Agris Lasmans	7	4	3	1–1	46	45	28	25	0	12	48.5%	150.675	Playoffs
Great Britain	Jo Butterfield / Jason Kean	7	3	4	1–0	47	56	25	29	0	8	51.5%	95.075	
Japan	Aki Ogawa / Yoji Nakajima	7	3	4	0–1	30	53	19	30	0	8	49.0%	88.067	
Estonia	Katlin Riidebach / Ain Villau	7	2	5	1–0	31	58	22	28	0	9	47.6%	98.233	
Italy	Orietta Bertò / Paolo Ioriatti	7	2	5	0–1	43	51	28	30	0	11	55.6%	73.700	

Source: Official website

Mixed doubles round robin summary table
Pos.	Country	China	Estonia	Great Britain	Italy	Japan	Latvia	South Korea	United States	Record
1	China	—N/a	12–2	10–5	8–7	10–3	10–2	10–6	6–7	6–1
7	Estonia	2–12	—N/a	10–7	6–4	3–8	6–9	0–10	4–8	2–5
5	Great Britain	5–10	7–10	—N/a	10–11	11–2	6–5	3–14	5–4	3–4
8	Italy	7–8	4–6	11–10	—N/a	5–6	4–9	7–5	5–7	2–5
6	Japan	3–10	8–3	2–11	6–5	—N/a	4–10	0–9	7–5	3–4
4	Latvia	2–10	9–6	5–6	9–4	10–4	—N/a	5–4	6–11	4–3
3	South Korea	6–10	10–0	14–3	5–7	9–0	4–5	—N/a	10–1	4–3
2	United States	7–6	8–4	4–5	7–5	5–7	11–6	1–10	—N/a	4–3

=== Round robin results ===
All draw times are listed in Central European Time (UTC+01:00).

==== Draw 1 ====
Wednesday, March 4, 19:05

Sheet A	1	2	3	4	5	6	7	8	Final
Italy (Bertò / Ioriatti)	1	2	1	0	1	1	1	0	7
South Korea (Baek / Lee) 🔨	0	0	0	4	0	0	0	1	5

Sheet B	1	2	3	4	5	6	7	8	Final
Japan (Ogawa / Nakajima) 🔨	1	1	0	1	0	0	0	X	3
China (Wang / Yang)	0	0	4	0	2	3	1	X	10

Sheet C	1	2	3	4	5	6	7	8	Final
Great Britain (Butterfield / Kean)	0	2	0	0	2	3	0	0	7
Estonia (Riidebach / Villau) 🔨	2	0	2	1	0	0	3	2	10

Sheet D	1	2	3	4	5	6	7	8	Final
Latvia (Rožkova / Lasmans)	0	0	4	0	1	1	0	0	6
United States (Dwyer / Emt) 🔨	1	2	0	3	0	0	1	4	11

==== Draw 2 ====
Thursday, March 5, 10:05

Sheet A	1	2	3	4	5	6	7	8	Final
China (Wang / Yang) 🔨	1	2	0	3	0	3	1	X	10
Latvia (Rožkova / Lasmans)	0	0	1	0	1	0	0	X	2

Sheet B	1	2	3	4	5	6	7	8	Final
Estonia (Riidebach / Villau) 🔨	1	0	1	1	1	1	1	0	6
Italy (Bertò / Ioriatti)	0	1	0	0	0	0	0	3	4

Sheet C	1	2	3	4	5	6	7	8	Final
Japan (Ogawa / Nakajima) 🔨	1	0	2	1	2	0	1	X	7
United States (Dwyer / Emt)	0	1	0	0	0	4	0	X	5

Sheet D	1	2	3	4	5	6	7	8	Final
Great Britain (Butterfield / Kean) 🔨	1	0	1	0	0	1	0	X	3
South Korea (Baek / Lee)	0	3	0	5	2	0	4	X	14

==== Draw 3 ====
Thursday, March 5, 19:05

Sheet A	1	2	3	4	5	6	7	8	Final
United States (Dwyer / Emt)	0	3	2	2	0	1	0	X	8
Estonia (Riidebach / Villau) 🔨	2	0	0	0	1	0	1	X	4

Sheet B	1	2	3	4	5	6	7	8	Final
South Korea (Baek / Lee)	1	1	2	2	2	1	X	X	9
Japan (Ogawa / Nakajima) 🔨	0	0	0	0	0	0	X	X	0

Sheet C	1	2	3	4	5	6	7	8	Final
Latvia (Rožkova / Lasmans)	1	0	1	0	0	1	1	1	5
Great Britain (Butterfield / Kean) 🔨	0	3	0	2	1	0	0	0	6

Sheet D	1	2	3	4	5	6	7	8	EE	Final
Italy (Bertò / Ioriatti) 🔨	3	0	0	1	2	0	1	0	0	7
China (Wang / Yang)	0	1	2	0	0	3	0	1	1	8

==== Draw 4 ====
Friday, March 6, 9:05

Sheet A	1	2	3	4	5	6	7	8	Final
Japan (Ogawa / Nakajima) 🔨	2	2	1	0	0	0	0	1	6
Italy (Bertò / Ioriatti)	0	0	0	1	1	1	2	0	5

Sheet B	1	2	3	4	5	6	7	8	Final
Great Britain (Butterfield / Kean)	1	0	0	1	0	2	0	1	5
United States (Dwyer / Emt) 🔨	0	1	1	0	1	0	1	0	4

Sheet C	1	2	3	4	5	6	7	8	Final
China (Wang / Yang) 🔨	1	0	2	1	0	2	0	4	10
South Korea (Baek / Lee)	0	1	0	0	3	0	2	0	6

Sheet D	1	2	3	4	5	6	7	8	Final
Estonia (Riidebach / Villau) 🔨	0	0	2	0	3	1	0	X	6
Latvia (Rožkova / Lasmans)	1	1	0	3	0	0	4	X	9

==== Draw 5 ====
Saturday, March 7, 14:35

Sheet A	1	2	3	4	5	6	7	8	Final
South Korea (Baek / Lee)	3	1	0	3	1	2	X	X	10
United States (Dwyer / Emt) 🔨	0	0	1	0	0	0	X	X	1

Sheet B	1	2	3	4	5	6	7	8	Final
China (Wang / Yang) 🔨	2	0	1	3	3	0	3	X	12
Estonia (Riidebach / Villau)	0	1	0	0	0	1	0	X	2

Sheet C	1	2	3	4	5	6	7	8	Final
Italy (Bertò / Ioriatti) 🔨	2	0	1	0	1	0	0	0	4
Latvia (Rožkova / Lasmans)	0	3	0	2	0	2	1	1	9

Sheet D	1	2	3	4	5	6	7	8	Final
Japan (Ogawa / Nakajima)	0	0	0	0	0	2	0	X	2
Great Britain (Butterfield / Kean) 🔨	2	2	1	1	2	0	3	X	11

==== Draw 6 ====
Sunday, March 8, 14:35

Sheet A	1	2	3	4	5	6	7	8	Final
Great Britain (Butterfield / Kean) 🔨	3	0	2	0	0	0	0	X	5
China (Wang / Yang)	0	1	0	2	2	3	2	X	10

Sheet B	1	2	3	4	5	6	7	8	Final
Latvia (Rožkova / Lasmans)	0	1	1	0	0	1	0	2	5
South Korea (Baek / Lee) 🔨	1	0	0	1	1	0	1	0	4

Sheet C	1	2	3	4	5	6	7	8	Final
Estonia (Riidebach / Villau) 🔨	1	1	1	0	0	0	0	X	3
Japan (Ogawa / Nakajima)	0	0	0	3	1	1	3	X	8

Sheet D	1	2	3	4	5	6	7	8	Final
United States (Dwyer / Emt)	0	4	0	1	0	0	1	1	7
Italy (Bertò / Ioriatti) 🔨	1	0	1	0	2	1	0	0	5

==== Draw 7 ====
Monday, March 9, 14:35

Sheet A	1	2	3	4	5	6	7	8	Final
Latvia (Rožkova / Lasmans)	2	1	2	0	4	0	1	X	10
Japan (Ogawa / Nakajima) 🔨	0	0	0	2	0	2	0	X	4

Sheet B	1	2	3	4	5	6	7	8	EE	Final
Italy (Bertò / Ioriatti) 🔨	4	1	0	2	0	3	0	0	1	11
Great Britain (Butterfield / Kean)	0	0	2	0	2	0	3	3	0	10

Sheet C	1	2	3	4	5	6	7	8	Final
United States (Dwyer / Emt) 🔨	1	2	1	0	0	0	2	1	7
China (Wang / Yang)	0	0	0	4	1	1	0	0	6

Sheet D	1	2	3	4	5	6	7	8	Final
South Korea (Baek / Lee) 🔨	3	1	1	1	3	1	X	X	10
Estonia (Riidebach / Villau)	0	0	0	0	0	0	X	X	0

=== Playoffs ===
Semifinals
1	China	8
4	Latvia	3
2	United States	3
3	South Korea	6

Gold medal game
1	China	9
3	South Korea	7
Bronze medal game
2	United States	10
4	Latvia	11

==== Semifinals ====
Tuesday, March 10, 14:35

Sheet A	1	2	3	4	5	6	7	8	Final
China (Wang / Yang) 🔨	2	0	2	2	0	0	2	X	8
Latvia (Rožkova / Lasmans)	0	1	0	0	1	1	0	X	3

Sheet D	1	2	3	4	5	6	7	8	Final
United States (Dwyer / Emt) 🔨	0	1	0	1	0	0	1	X	3
South Korea (Baek / Lee)	2	0	2	0	1	1	0	X	6

==== Bronze medal game ====
Wednesday, March 11, 14:35

Sheet B	1	2	3	4	5	6	7	8	EE	Final
United States (Dwyer / Emt) 🔨	4	0	0	1	0	4	0	1	0	10
Latvia (Rožkova / Lasmans)	0	5	1	0	1	0	3	0	1	11

==== Gold medal game ====
Wednesday, March 11, 14:35

Sheet C	1	2	3	4	5	6	7	8	EE	Final
China (Wang / Yang) 🔨	3	0	2	0	0	2	0	0	2	9
South Korea (Baek / Lee)	0	1	0	1	1	0	3	1	0	7

=== Final standings ===
The final standings are:

Place	Team
1st place, gold medalist(s)	China
2nd place, silver medalist(s)	South Korea
3rd place, bronze medalist(s)	Latvia
4	United States
5	Great Britain
6	Japan
7	Estonia
8	Italy

=== Statistics ===
==== Player percentages ====
Percentages by draw.

===== Female =====
#	Curler	1	2	3	4	5	6	7	Total
1	Wang Meng (CHN)	59	66	67	47	77	64	50	61.1
2	Baek Hye-jin (KOR)	23	77	58	56	67	45	77	56.4
3	Katlin Riidebach (EST)	47	72	48	54	66	45	33	52.1
4	Orietta Bertò (ITA)	66	60	49	45	42	53	37	50.0
5	Poļina Rožkova (LAT)	38	29	50	60	61	53	50	48.7
6	Aki Ogawa (JPN)	43	69	38	58	34	67	20	47.8
7	Jo Butterfield (GBR)	27	41	57	43	62	29	56	44.8
8	Laura Dwyer (USA)	36	30	48	53	29	55	53	43.4

===== Male =====
#	Curler	1	2	3	4	5	6	7	Total
1	Yang Jinqiao (CHN)	68	67	68	52	82	68	70	67.5
2	Lee Yong-suk (KOR)	32	67	72	59	68	71	74	62.2
3	Stephen Emt (USA)	54	50	67	74	48	58	68	61.9
4	Paolo Ioriatti (ITA)	65	35	54	66	57	67	71	59.3
5	Jason Kean (GBR)	44	46	66	74	61	38	59	55.9
6	Yoji Nakajima (JPN)	51	68	31	51	42	55	45	49.8
7	Agris Lasmans (LAT)	35	39	48	55	40	60	60	48.1
8	Ain Villau (EST)	62	40	24	52	45	53	15	44.0

===== Team total =====
#	Team	1	2	3	4	5	6	7	Total
1	China	64	66	67	50	80	66	62	64.9
2	South Korea	29	71	67	58	68	61	75	59.9
3	Italy	65	45	52	58	51	61	58	55.6
4	United States	47	40	60	66	39	57	62	53.4
5	Great Britain	37	44	62	62	61	34	58	51.5
6	Japan	48	68	33	54	39	60	35	49.0
7	Latvia	36	35	49	58	50	56	55	48.5
8	Estonia	56	55	34	53	56	50	24	47.6
