= World Wheelchair Mixed Doubles Curling Championship =

International wheelchair curling event

- Established: 2022
- 2027 host city: Lohja, Finland
- 2027 arena: Kisakallio Sports Institute
- 2025 champion: Japan

Current edition
- 2027 World Wheelchair Mixed Doubles Curling Championship

The World Wheelchair Mixed Doubles Curling Championship is an annual world championship held to determine the world's best mixed doubles curling team in wheelchair curling.

The event began in 2022.

== Medallists ==
Following is a list of medallists:

Year	Location	Gold	Silver	Bronze
2022	(Finland) Lohja	Sweden; Sabina Johansson; Marcus Holm	Hungary; Rita Sárai; Viktor Beke	Norway; Rikke Iversen; Rune Lorentsen
2023	(Canada) Richmond	Latvia; Poļina Rožkova; Agris Lasmans	United States; Pam Wilson; David Samsa	Canada; Collinda Joseph; Dennis Thiessen
2024	(South Korea) Gangneung	South Korea; Cho Min-kyong; Jeong Tae-yeong	China; Wang Meng; Yang Jinqiao	Italy; Orietta Berto; Paolo Ioriatti
2025	(Scotland) Stevenston	Japan; Aki Ogawa; Yoji Nakajima	Scotland; Charlotte McKenna; Hugh Nibloe	Estonia; Katlin Riidebach; Ain Villau
2027	(Finland) Lohja			

== All-time medal table ==
As of 2025 World Wheelchair Mixed Doubles Curling Championship

Rank	Nation	Gold	Silver	Bronze	Total
1	Japan	1	0	0	1
1	Latvia	1	0	0	1
1	South Korea	1	0	0	1
1	Sweden	1	0	0	1
5	China	0	1	0	1
5	Hungary	0	1	0	1
5	Scotland	0	1	0	1
5	United States	0	1	0	1
9	Canada	0	0	1	1
9	Estonia	0	0	1	1
9	Italy	0	0	1	1
9	Norway	0	0	1	1
Totals (12 entries)		4	4	4	12

== Performance timeline ==
Country	2020s					Years
Country	22	23	24	25	27	Years
Brazil				20		1
Canada	13	3rd place, bronze medalist(s)	17	6		4
China		4	2nd place, silver medalist(s)	10		3
Czech Republic	15			7		2
Denmark	12	18	12	15		4
England		5	9	12		3
Estonia	10	9	8	3rd place, bronze medalist(s)		4
Finland	16	19	11	17		4
Germany	9	10				2
Hungary	2nd place, silver medalist(s)	11	16	13		4
Italy	4	12	3rd place, bronze medalist(s)	16		4
Japan	18	13	4	1st place, gold medalist(s)		4
Latvia	5	1st place, gold medalist(s)	7	11		4
Norway	3rd place, bronze medalist(s)	14	14	5		4
Poland		17	19	19		3
Scotland	14	8	10	2nd place, silver medalist(s)		4
Slovakia	7	6	6	8		4
Slovenia			21			1
South Korea	8	7	1st place, gold medalist(s)	4		4
Spain			20	21		3
Sweden	1st place, gold medalist(s)	15	13			3
Switzerland	11	16	15	14		4
Turkey	17		18	18		3
United States	5	2nd place, silver medalist(s)	5	9		4

== Records ==
Most championship appearances
Female curler	Male curler	Country	No.	Years
Poļina Rožkova	Agris Lasmans	Latvia	4	2022–2025
Monika Kunkelová	Radoslav Ďuriš	Slovakia	4	2022–2025
