= Wheelchair curling at the Winter Paralympics =

- Governing body: WCF
- Events: 2 (mixed)

Games
- 1976; 1980; 1984; 1988; 1992; 1994; 1998; 2002; 2006; 2010; 2014; 2018; 2022; 2026
- Medalists

Wheelchair curling tournaments have been staged at the Paralympic Games since the Winter Paralympic Games in 2006 in Turin.

Tournaments are staged for mixed gender teams as well as mixed doubles.

Canada has been the most successful team in the mixed team tournaments, winning four of six gold medals.

China won the inaugural gold medal in the mixed doubles tournament in 2026.

== Participating nations ==
The final placement for each team in each tournament is shown in the following tables.

=== Participating nations ===
Mixed team

Nation	(Italy); 2006	(Canada); 2010	(Russia); 2014	(South Korea); 2018	(China); 2022	(Italy); 2026
Canada	1st place, gold medalist(s)	1st place, gold medalist(s)	1st place, gold medalist(s)	3rd place, bronze medalist(s)	3rd place, bronze medalist(s)	1st place, gold medalist(s)
China	–	–	4	1st place, gold medalist(s)	1st place, gold medalist(s)	2nd place, silver medalist(s)
Denmark	5	–	–	–	–	–
Estonia	–	–	–	–	10	–
Finland	–	–	10	11	–	–
Germany	–	8	–	8	–	–
Great Britain	2nd place, silver medalist(s)	6	3rd place, bronze medalist(s)	7	8	10
Italy	7	5	–	–	–	6
Japan	–	10	–	–	–	–
Latvia	–	–	–	–	9	7
Neutral Paralympic Athletes	–	–	–	5	–	–
Norway	4	9	8	2nd place, silver medalist(s)	7	5
Russia	–	–	2nd place, silver medalist(s)	–	–	–
RPC	–	–	–	–	DSQ	–
Slovakia	–	–	6	9	4	8
South Korea	–	2nd place, silver medalist(s)	9	4	6	4
Sweden	3rd place, bronze medalist(s)	3rd place, bronze medalist(s)	7	10	2nd place, silver medalist(s)	3rd place, bronze medalist(s)
Switzerland	6	7	–	6	11	–
United States	8	4	5	12	5	9
Total teams	8	10	10	12	11	10

Mixed doubles

Nation	(Italy) 2026
China	1st place, gold medalist(s)
Estonia	7
Great Britain	5
Italy	8
Japan	6
Latvia	3rd place, bronze medalist(s)
South Korea	2nd place, silver medalist(s)
United States	4
Total teams	8

== Medal table ==
As of 2026 Winter Paralympics

Rank	Nation	Gold	Silver	Bronze	Total
1	Canada (CAN)	4	0	2	6
2	China (CHN)	3	1	0	4
3	South Korea (KOR)	0	2	0	2
4	Sweden (SWE)	0	1	3	4
5	Great Britain (GBR)	0	1	1	2
6	Norway (NOR)	0	1	0	1
6	Russia (RUS)	0	1	0	1
8	Latvia (LAT)	0	0	1	1
Totals (8 entries)		7	7	7	21

== Medal summary ==
=== Mixed team ===
Games	Gold	Silver	Bronze
2006 Turin	Canada (CAN); Chris Daw; Gerry Austgarden; Gary Cormack; Sonja Gaudet; Karen Blachford	Great Britain (GBR); Frank Duffy; Michael McCreadie; Tom Killin; Angie Malone; Ken Dickson	Sweden (SWE); Jalle Jungnell; Glenn Ikonen; Rolf Johansson; Anette Wilhelm; Bernt Sjöberg
2010 Vancouver	Canada (CAN); Jim Armstrong; Darryl Neighbour; Ina Forrest; Sonja Gaudet; Bruno Yizek	South Korea (KOR); Kim Hak-sung; Kim Myung-jin; Cho Yang-hyun; Kang Mi-suk; Park Kil-woo	Sweden (SWE); Jalle Jungnell; Glenn Ikonen*; Patrik Burman; Anette Wilhelm; Patrik Kallin
2014 Sochi	Canada (CAN); Jim Armstrong; Dennis Thiessen; Ina Forrest; Sonja Gaudet; Mark Ideson	Russia (RUS); Andrei Smirnov; Alexander Shevchenko; Svetlana Pakhomova; Marat Romanov; Oksana Slesarenko	Great Britain (GBR); Aileen Neilson; Gregor Ewan; Bob McPherson; Jim Gault; Angie Malone
2018 Pyeongchang	China (CHN); Wang Haitao; Chen Jianxin; Liu Wei; Wang Meng; Zhang Qiang	Norway (NOR); Rune Lorentsen; Jostein Stordahl; Ole Fredrik Syversen; Sissel Løchen; Rikke Iversen	Canada (CAN); Mark Ideson; Ina Forrest; Dennis Thiessen; Marie Wright; James Anseeuw
2022 Beijing	China (CHN); Wang Haitao; Chen Jianxin; Zhang Mingliang; Yan Zhuo; Sun Yulong	Sweden (SWE); Viljo Petersson-Dahl; Ronny Persson; Mats-Ola Engborg; Kristina Ulander; Sabina Johansson	Canada (CAN); Jon Thurston; Ina Forrest; Dennis Thiessen; Mark Ideson; Collinda Joseph
2026 Milano Cortina	Canada (CAN); Mark Ideson; Jon Thurston; Ina Forrest; Collinda Joseph; Gil Dash	China (CHN); Wang Haitao; Chen Jianxin; Zhang Mingliang; Li Nana; Zhang Qiang	Sweden (SWE); Viljo Petersson-Dahl; Ronny Persson; Marcus Holm; Kristina Ulander; Sabina Johansson

=== Mixed doubles ===
Games	Gold	Silver	Bronze
2026 Cortina D'Ampezzo	China (CHN); Wang Meng; Yang Jinqiao	South Korea (KOR); Baek Hye-jin; Lee Yong-suk	Latvia (LAT); Poļina Rožkova; Agris Lasmans

== Tournaments ==
=== Mixed team ===
Year	Host	Gold medal game			Bronze medal game
Year	Host	Gold medalist	Score	Silver medalist	Bronze medalist	Score	Fourth place
2006 details	Turin	Canada	7–4	Great Britain	Sweden	10–2	Norway
2010 details	Vancouver	Canada	8–7	South Korea	Sweden	7–5	United States
2014 details	Sochi	Canada	8–3	Russia	Great Britain	7–3	China
2018 details	Pyeongchang	China	6–5	Norway	Canada	5–3	South Korea
2022 details	Beijing	China	8–3	Sweden	Canada	8–3	Slovakia
2026 details	Cortina d'Ampezzo	Canada	4–3	China	Sweden	7–4	South Korea

=== Mixed doubles ===
Year	Host	Gold medal game			Bronze medal game
Year	Host	Gold medalist	Score	Silver medalist	Bronze medalist	Score	Fourth place
2026 details	Milan-Cortina d'Ampezzo	China	9–7	South Korea	Latvia	11–10	United States

== Complete results ==
1. Torino 2006 - wheelchair-curling
2. Vancouver 2010 - wheelchair-curling
3. PyeongChang 2018 - wheelchair-curling
4. Beijing 2022 - wheelchair-curling

== See also ==
- Curling at the Winter Olympics
