= Sabina Johansson =

Swedish wheelchair curler

- Curler
- Born: 4 January 1973 (age 53); Hällefors, Örebro County, Sweden

Curling career
- Member Association: Sweden
- World Wheelchair Championship: 3 (2021, 2024, 2025)
- World Wheelchair Mixed Doubles Championship: 1 (2022)
- Paralympic: 2 (2022, 2026)
Medal record
Wheelchair curling
Representing Sweden
Winter Paralympics
| Silver medal – second place | 2022 Beijing | Mixed team |
| Bronze medal – third place | 2026 Milano Cortina | Mixed team |
World Wheelchair Championship
| Silver medal – second place | 2021 Beijing |
World Wheelchair Mixed Doubles Championship
| Gold medal – first place | 2022 Lohja |

Helena Sabina Erica Johansson (born 4 January 1973) is a Swedish wheelchair curler.

== Career ==
Johansson is a silver medalist in the 4-person mixed team wheelchair curling events at the 2021 World Wheelchair Curling Championship and 2022 Winter Paralympics. She is also a world champion in wheelchair mixed doubles, winning the inaugural 2022 World Wheelchair Mixed Doubles with teammate Marcus Holm.

== Teams ==
| Season | Skip | Third | Second | Lead | Alternate | Coach | Events |
|---|---|---|---|---|---|---|---|
| 2021-22 | Viljo Petersson-Dahl | Ronny Persson | Mats-Ola Engborg | Kristina Ulander | Sabina Johansson | Alison Kreviazuk, Peter Narup (NC) | WWhCC 2021 (silver) |
| 2022–23 | Vilko Petersson-Dahl | Ronny Persson | Mats-Ola Engborg | Kristina Ulander | Sabina Johansson | Peter Narup | 2022 WPG (silver) |
| 2023–24 | Vilko Petersson-Dahl | Ronny Persson | Marcus Holm | Sabina Johansson | Kristina Ulander | Peter Narup | WWhCC 2024 (4th) |
| 2024–25 | Vilko Petersson-Dahl | Ronny Persson | Sabina Johansson | Kristina Ulander | Tommy Andersson | Peter Narup | WWhCC 2025 (5th) |

=== Mixed doubles ===
| Season | Female | Male | Coach | Events |
|---|---|---|---|---|
| 2021–22 | Sabina Johansson | Marcus Holm | Peter Narup | WWhMDCC 2022 (gold) |
