= Nam Bong-kwang =

South Korean wheelchair curler (born 1981)

- Curler
- Born: 12 July 1981 (age 45)

Curling career
- Member Association: South Korea
- World Wheelchair Championship: 1 (2025)
- Paralympic: 1 (2026)
Medal record
Wheelchair curling
Representing South Korea
World Championship
Silver medal – second place	2025 Stevenston	Mixed team

Nam Bong-kwang (Korean: 남봉광; born 12 July 1981) is a South Korean wheelchair curler. He represented South Korea at the 2026 Winter Paralympics.

== Career ==
Nam competed at the 2025 World Wheelchair Curling Championship and won a silver medal in the mixed team event, losing to China in the final.

In February 2026, he was selected to represent South Korea at the 2026 Winter Paralympics.

== Personal life ==
His wife, Baek Hye-jin, is also a Paralympic wheelchair curler. The two met and began dating in 2016 and got married in November 2020.
