= 2024 World Wheelchair Mixed Doubles Curling Championship =

- Host city: Gangneung, South Korea
- Arena: Gangneung Curling Centre
- Dates: March 11–16
- Winner: South Korea
- Female: Cho Min-kyong
- Male: Jeong Tae-yeong
- Finalist: China (Wang / Yang)

The 2024 World Wheelchair Mixed Doubles Curling Championship (branded as the 2024 SD Biosensor World Wheelchair Mixed Doubles Curling Championship for sponsorship reasons) was held from March 11 to 16 at the Gangneung Curling Centre in Gangneung, South Korea.

== Teams ==
The teams are listed as follows:

Canada	China	Denmark	England
Female: Collinda Joseph; Male: Dennis Thiessen	Female: Wang Meng; Male: Yang Jinqiao	Female: Helle Schmidt; Male: Kenneth Ørbæk	Female: Karen Aspey; Male: Stewart Pimblett
Estonia	Finland	Hungary	Italy
Female: Katlin Riidebach; Male: Mait Mätas	Female: Ritva Lampinen; Male: Harry Tuomaala	Female: Anikó Sasadi; Male: Péter Barkóczi	Female: Orietta Berto; Male: Paolo Ioriatti
Japan	Latvia	Norway	Poland
Female: Aki Ogawa; Male: Yoji Nakajima	Female: Poļina Rožkova; Male: Agris Lasmans	Female: Rikke Iversen; Male: Rune Lorentsen	Female: Monika Bodych; Male: Łukasz Waszek
Scotland	Slovakia	Slovenia	South Korea
Female: Charlotte McKenna; Male: Gary Smith	Female: Monika Kunkelová; Male: Radoslav Ďuriš	Female: Jovita Jeglič; Male: Robert Žerovnik	Female: Cho Min-kyong; Male: Jeong Tae-yeong
Spain	Sweden	Switzerland	Turkey
Female: Anna Nadal Rodriguez; Male: Bertrand Tramont	Female: Johanna Glennert; Male: Tommy Andersson	Female: Melanie Villars; Male: Pierre-Alain Tercier	Female: Zuleyha Bingol; Male: Kenan Coskun
United States			
Female: Batoyun Uranchimeg; Male: Matthew Thums			

== Round robin standings ==
Final Round Robin Standings

Key
Teams to Playoffs

Group A	Athletes	W	L	W–L	PF	PA	EW	EL	BE	SE	DSC
Slovakia	Monika Kunkelová / Radoslav Ďuriš	5	1	1–0	45	22	30	15	0	19	99.11
Latvia	Poļina Rožkova / Agris Lasmans	5	1	0–1	51	25	26	16	0	13	110.63
Estonia	Katlin Riidebach / Mait Mätas	3	3	–	40	43	22	24	0	8	94.97
Scotland	Charlotte McKenna / Gary Smith	2	4	2–1; 1–0	29	41	20	25	0	7	68.92
Norway	Rikke Iversen / Rune Lorentsen	2	4	2–1; 0–1	38	39	21	25	0	10	94.40
Turkey	Zuleyha Bingol / Kenan Coskun	2	4	1–2; 1–0	27	44	19	25	0	6	137.88
Poland	Monika Bodych / Łukasz Waszek	2	4	1–2; 0–1	33	49	18	26	0	6	101.86

Group B	Athletes	W	L	W–L	PF	PA	EW	EL	BE	SE	DSC
United States	Batoyun Uranchimeg / Matthew Thums	6	0	–	52	20	28	15	0	12	44.95
Italy	Orietta Berto / Paolo Ioriatti	4	2	1–0	49	32	24	20	0	11	117.61
England	Karen Aspey / Stewart Pimblett	4	2	0–1	37	35	24	19	0	10	134.62
Finland	Ritva Lampinen / Harry Tuomaala	3	3	–	39	43	20	23	0	4	120.76
Switzerland	Melanie Villars / Pierre-Alain Tercier	2	4	1–0	37	49	21	24	0	9	116.27
Canada	Collinda Joseph / Dennis Thiessen	2	4	0–1	34	33	23	20	0	8	120.92
Slovenia	Jovita Jeglič / Robert Žerovnik	0	6	–	16	52	11	30	0	1	150.65

Group C	Athletes	W	L	W–L	PF	PA	EW	EL	BE	SE	DSC
South Korea	Cho Min-kyong / Jeong Tae-yeong	5	1	1–1	51	29	25	22	0	8	95.67
China	Wang Meng / Yang Jinqiao	5	1	1–1	53	33	25	19	0	10	96.61
Japan	Aki Ogawa / Yoji Nakajima	5	1	1–1	38	32	26	20	0	9	106.62
Denmark	Helle Schmidt / Kenneth Ørbæk	3	3	–	38	42	23	24	0	9	167.05
Sweden	Johanna Glennert / Tommy Andersson	2	4	–	43	39	25	20	0	12	89.31
Hungary	Anikó Sasadi / Péter Barkóczi	1	5	–	29	50	17	29	0	3	105.01
Spain	Anna Nadal Rodriguez / Bertrand Tramont	0	6	–	26	53	20	27	0	7	111.18

== Round robin results ==
All draws times are listed in Korea Standard Time (UTC+09:00).

=== Draw 1 ===
Monday, March 11, 9:00 am

Sheet A	1	2	3	4	5	6	7	8	Final
United States (Uranchimeg / Thums) 🔨	1	0	1	4	0	1	2	X	9
Finland (Lampinen / Tuomaala)	0	1	0	0	1	0	0	X	2

Sheet B	1	2	3	4	5	6	7	8	Final
Estonia (Riidebach / Mätas) 🔨	3	2	1	0	2	0	1	X	9
Turkey (Bingol / Coskun)	0	0	0	1	0	2	0	X	3

Sheet C	1	2	3	4	5	6	7	8	Final
Poland (Bodych / Waszek)	1	0	2	1	0	3	0	0	7
Norway (Iversen / Lorentsen) 🔨	0	2	0	0	4	0	3	2	11

Sheet D	1	2	3	4	5	6	7	8	Final
Latvia (Rožkova / Lasmans)	1	0	0	0	0	0	0	X	1
Slovakia (Kunkelová / Ďuriš) 🔨	0	3	1	1	1	2	1	X	9

=== Draw 2 ===
Monday, March 11, 12:30 pm

Sheet A	1	2	3	4	5	6	7	8	Final
Hungary (Sasadi / Barkóczi) 🔨	2	0	0	0	2	0	3	0	7
China (Wang / Yang)	0	1	2	1	0	2	0	3	9

Sheet B	1	2	3	4	5	6	7	8	Final
Japan (Ogawa / Nakajima)	1	1	2	0	1	0	2	0	7
Spain (Rodriguez / Tramont) 🔨	0	0	0	1	0	2	0	1	4

Sheet C	1	2	3	4	5	6	7	8	Final
Switzerland (Villars / Tercier)	1	1	1	0	2	1	0	X	6
Canada (Joseph / Thiessen) 🔨	0	0	0	1	0	0	2	X	3

Sheet D	1	2	3	4	5	6	7	8	Final
South Korea (Cho / Jeong)	0	3	1	0	5	0	0	1	10
Denmark (Schmidt / Ørbæk) 🔨	4	0	0	1	0	1	1	0	7

=== Draw 3 ===
Monday, March 11, 4:00 pm

Sheet A	1	2	3	4	5	6	7	8	Final
Norway (Iversen / Lorentsen)	1	2	1	0	0	3	0	0	7
Estonia (Riidebach / Mätas) 🔨	0	0	0	2	2	0	3	1	8

Sheet B	1	2	3	4	5	6	7	8	Final
Latvia (Rožkova / Lasmans)	2	1	2	1	0	3	1	X	10
Poland (Bodych / Waszek) 🔨	0	0	0	0	1	0	0	X	1

Sheet C	1	2	3	4	5	6	7	8	Final
Slovakia (Kunkelová / Ďuriš) 🔨	3	1	1	2	0	4	0	X	11
Scotland (McKenna / Smith)	0	0	0	0	2	0	1	X	3

Sheet D	1	2	3	4	5	6	7	8	Final
Italy (Berto / Ioriatti) 🔨	3	0	2	3	0	4	X	X	12
England (Aspey / Pimblett)	0	1	0	0	2	0	X	X	3

=== Draw 4 ===
Monday, March 11, 7:30 pm

Sheet A	1	2	3	4	5	6	7	8	EE	Final
Denmark (Schmidt / Ørbæk)	1	0	0	3	0	0	2	2	X	W
Sweden (Glennert / Andersson) 🔨	0	2	1	0	3	2	0	0	X	L

Sheet B	1	2	3	4	5	6	7	8	Final
South Korea (Cho / Jeong) 🔨	4	0	1	0	4	2	1	X	12
Hungary (Sasadi / Barkóczi)	0	2	0	1	0	0	0	X	3

Sheet C	1	2	3	4	5	6	7	8	Final
China (Wang / Yang) 🔨	5	0	2	0	0	3	1	X	11
Japan (Ogawa / Nakajima)	0	1	0	1	2	0	0	X	4

Sheet D	1	2	3	4	5	6	7	8	Final
Slovenia (Jeglič / Žerovnik)	0	0	1	0	0	0	X	X	1
Canada (Joseph / Thiessen) 🔨	3	3	0	1	1	1	X	X	9

- Sweden ran out of time in the extra end, and therefore forfeited the game

=== Draw 5 ===
Tuesday, March 12, 9:00 am

Sheet A	1	2	3	4	5	6	7	8	Final
Switzerland (Villars / Tercier) 🔨	0	1	0	2	1	0	1	0	5
England (Aspey / Pimblett)	1	0	2	0	0	2	0	1	6

Sheet B	1	2	3	4	5	6	7	8	Final
United States (Uranchimeg / Thums) 🔨	1	0	2	0	1	2	1	X	7
Slovenia (Jeglič / Žerovnik)	0	1	0	1	0	0	0	X	2

Sheet C	1	2	3	4	5	6	7	8	Final
Norway (Iversen / Lorentsen) 🔨	0	2	1	2	0	2	0	X	7
Turkey (Bingol / Coskun)	1	0	0	0	1	0	1	X	3

Sheet D	1	2	3	4	5	6	7	8	Final
Finland (Lampinen / Tuomaala) 🔨	3	0	0	2	0	0	1	X	6
Italy (Berto / Ioriatti)	0	2	3	0	2	4	0	X	11

=== Draw 6 ===
Tuesday, March 12, 12:30 pm

Sheet A	1	2	3	4	5	6	7	8	Final
Scotland (McKenna / Smith)	0	1	0	2	0	0	0	X	3
Latvia (Rožkova / Lasmans) 🔨	1	0	1	0	2	1	1	X	6

Sheet B	1	2	3	4	5	6	7	8	Final
Spain (Rodriguez / Tramont)	0	1	1	0	0	0	1	X	3
Sweden (Glennert / Andersson) 🔨	2	0	0	3	2	3	0	X	10

Sheet C	1	2	3	4	5	6	7	8	Final
Denmark (Schmidt / Ørbæk)	0	3	0	0	1	0	0	3	7
China (Wang / Yang) 🔨	2	0	1	1	0	2	3	0	9

Sheet D	1	2	3	4	5	6	7	8	Final
Japan (Ogawa / Nakajima) 🔨	3	1	0	0	0	0	1	1	6
Hungary (Sasadi / Barkóczi)	0	0	2	1	1	1	0	0	5

=== Draw 7 ===
Tuesday, March 12, 4:00 pm

Sheet A	1	2	3	4	5	6	7	8	Final
Canada (Joseph / Thiessen) 🔨	0	1	1	0	1	0	2	1	6
Italy (Berto / Ioriatti)	1	0	0	3	0	1	0	0	5

Sheet B	1	2	3	4	5	6	7	8	Final
Finland (Lampinen / Tuomaala)	0	0	2	1	0	0	0	0	3
England (Aspey / Pimblett) 🔨	2	2	0	0	1	1	1	1	8

Sheet C	1	2	3	4	5	6	7	8	Final
Slovenia (Jeglič / Žerovnik) 🔨	2	2	0	0	1	0	2	0	7
Switzerland (Villars / Tercier)	0	0	3	3	0	4	0	1	11

Sheet D	1	2	3	4	5	6	7	8	Final
Slovakia (Kunkelová / Ďuriš)	0	2	1	1	0	1	0	1	6
Estonia (Riidebach / Mätas) 🔨	1	0	0	0	1	0	3	0	5

=== Draw 8 ===
Tuesday, March 12, 7:30 pm

Sheet A	1	2	3	4	5	6	7	8	Final
Poland (Bodych / Waszek) 🔨	0	1	1	0	1	0	1	/	L
Turkey (Bingol / Coskun)	1	0	0	2	0	2	0		W

Sheet B	1	2	3	4	5	6	7	8	Final
Hungary (Sasadi / Barkóczi) 🔨	1	0	1	0	1	0	0	0	3
Denmark (Schmidt / Ørbæk)	0	1	0	2	0	2	1	1	7

Sheet C	1	2	3	4	5	6	7	8	Final
Japan (Ogawa / Nakajima) 🔨	2	0	0	2	0	0	2	1	7
Sweden (Glennert / Andersson)	0	2	1	0	2	1	0	0	6

Sheet D	1	2	3	4	5	6	7	8	EE	Final
Spain (Rodriguez / Tramont) 🔨	1	0	0	1	0	2	0	2	0	6
South Korea (Cho / Jeong)	0	2	1	0	2	0	1	0	5	11

- Poland ran out of time in the 8th end, and therefore forfeited the game

=== Draw 9 ===
Wednesday, March 13, 9:00 am

Sheet A	1	2	3	4	5	6	7	8	Final
Turkey (Bingol / Coskun) 🔨	0	0	2	0	2	1	0	1	6
Slovakia (Kunkelová / Ďuriš)	1	1	0	1	0	0	1	0	4

Sheet B	1	2	3	4	5	6	7	8	Final
Norway (Iversen / Lorentsen)	0	3	0	0	1	0	1	X	5
Latvia (Rožkova / Lasmans) 🔨	4	0	2	1	0	3	0	X	10

Sheet C	1	2	3	4	5	6	7	8	Final
Scotland (McKenna / Smith) 🔨	0	0	1	2	0	1	1	X	5
Poland (Bodych / Waszek)	2	2	0	0	4	0	0	X	8

Sheet D	1	2	3	4	5	6	7	8	Final
Denmark (Schmidt / Ørbæk)	0	0	1	1	1	0	0	X	3
Japan (Ogawa / Nakajima) 🔨	1	3	0	0	0	3	1	X	8

=== Draw 10 ===
Wednesday, March 13, 12:30 pm

Sheet A	1	2	3	4	5	6	7	8	Final
China (Wang / Yang) 🔨	2	2	2	3	2	0	1	X	12
Spain (Rodriguez / Tramont)	0	0	0	0	0	2	0	X	2

Sheet B	1	2	3	4	5	6	7	8	Final
Slovenia (Jeglič / Žerovnik)	0	0	0	1	0	0	1	X	2
Italy (Berto / Ioriatti) 🔨	1	2	1	0	1	1	0	X	6

Sheet C	1	2	3	4	5	6	7	8	Final
Canada (Joseph / Thiessen)	1	0	1	0	4	0	1	X	7
Finland (Lampinen / Tuomaala) 🔨	0	4	0	2	0	3	0	X	9

Sheet D	1	2	3	4	5	6	7	8	Final
England (Aspey / Pimblett)	0	3	0	0	0	0	1	X	4
United States (Uranchimeg / Thums) 🔨	1	0	1	4	1	1	0	X	8

=== Draw 11 ===
Wednesday, March 13, 4:00 pm

Sheet A	1	2	3	4	5	6	7	8	Final
Estonia (Riidebach / Mätas)	0	1	1	2	0	2	0	1	7
Scotland (McKenna / Smith) 🔨	1	0	0	0	4	0	1	0	6

Sheet B	1	2	3	4	5	6	7	8	Final
Poland (Bodych / Waszek) 🔨	0	0	0	0	1	0	2	X	3
Slovakia (Kunkelová / Ďuriš)	1	1	2	1	0	4	0	X	9

Sheet C	1	2	3	4	5	6	7	8	Final
Sweden (Glennert / Andersson)	1	0	0	1	0	2	0	1	5
South Korea (Cho / Jeong) 🔨	0	3	1	0	2	0	1	0	7

Sheet D	1	2	3	4	5	6	7	8	Final
Turkey (Bingol / Coskun)	0	1	0	1	0	3	0	X	5
Latvia (Rožkova / Lasmans) 🔨	1	0	5	0	4	0	3	X	13

=== Draw 12 ===
Wednesday, March 13, 7:30 pm

Sheet A	1	2	3	4	5	6	7	8	Final
Finland (Lampinen / Tuomaala) 🔨	2	2	1	0	3	1	X	X	9
Slovenia (Jeglič / Žerovnik)	0	0	0	1	0	0	X	X	1

Sheet B	1	2	3	4	5	6	7	8	Final
England (Aspey / Pimblett) 🔨	2	0	2	0	1	1	0	X	6
Canada (Joseph / Thiessen)	0	2	0	1	0	0	1	X	4

Sheet C	1	2	3	4	5	6	7	8	EE	Final
Hungary (Sasadi / Barkóczi) 🔨	1	0	4	0	0	0	0	2	X	W
Spain (Rodriguez / Tramont)	0	3	0	1	1	1	1	0	X	L

Sheet D	1	2	3	4	5	6	7	8	Final
United States (Uranchimeg / Thums) 🔨	0	5	0	5	1	2	X	X	13
Switzerland (Villars / Tercier)	1	0	1	0	0	0	X	X	2

- Spain ran out of time in the extra end, and therefore forfeited the game

=== Draw 13 ===
Thursday, March 14, 9:00 am

Sheet A	1	2	3	4	5	6	7	8	Final
South Korea (Cho / Jeong)	0	0	0	0	1	2	0	0	3
Japan (Ogawa / Nakajima) 🔨	1	1	1	1	0	0	1	1	6

Sheet B	1	2	3	4	5	6	7	8	Final
Switzerland (Villars / Tercier)	4	0	0	0	0	1	0	2	7
Finland (Lampinen / Tuomaala) 🔨	0	1	4	2	1	0	2	0	10

Sheet C	1	2	3	4	5	6	7	8	Final
Spain (Rodriguez / Tramont)	0	1	1	1	1	0	0	0	4
Denmark (Schmidt / Ørbæk) 🔨	1	0	0	0	0	3	1	1	6

Sheet D	1	2	3	4	5	6	7	8	Final
Sweden (Glennert / Andersson)	0	2	1	1	1	0	0	X	5
China (Wang / Yang) 🔨	3	0	0	0	0	4	3	X	10

=== Draw 14 ===
Thursday, March 14, 12:30 pm

Sheet A	1	2	3	4	5	6	7	8	Final
Slovakia (Kunkelová / Ďuriš) 🔨	0	0	1	2	0	1	1	1	6
Norway (Iversen / Lorentsen)	1	2	0	0	1	0	0	0	4

Sheet B	1	2	3	4	5	6	7	8	Final
Turkey (Bingol / Coskun)	0	1	2	1	0	0	0	1	5
Scotland (McKenna / Smith) 🔨	1	0	0	0	2	2	2	0	7

Sheet C	1	2	3	4	5	6	7	8	Final
Italy (Berto / Ioriatti)	1	0	2	0	0	0	2	0	5
United States (Uranchimeg / Thums) 🔨	0	2	0	2	1	2	0	2	9

Sheet D	1	2	3	4	5	6	7	8	Final
Estonia (Riidebach / Mätas)	1	1	0	0	3	0	4	0	9
Poland (Bodych / Waszek) 🔨	0	0	1	1	0	5	0	3	10

=== Draw 15 ===
Thursday, March 14, 4:00 pm

Sheet A	1	2	3	4	5	6	7	8	Final
Sweden (Glennert / Andersson) 🔨	1	2	1	0	2	0	3	X	9
Hungary (Sasadi / Barkóczi)	0	0	0	3	0	1	0	X	4

Sheet B	1	2	3	4	5	6	7	8	Final
China (Wang / Yang)	0	0	0	0	1	0	1	X	2
South Korea (Cho / Jeong) 🔨	2	1	1	2	0	2	0	X	8

Sheet C	1	2	3	4	5	6	7	8	Final
England (Aspey / Pimblett) 🔨	1	1	1	2	0	2	3	X	10
Slovenia (Jeglič / Žerovnik)	0	0	0	0	3	0	0	X	3

=== Draw 16 ===
Thursday, March 14, 7:30 pm

Sheet A	1	2	3	4	5	6	7	8	Final
Italy (Berto / Ioriatti)	1	1	0	0	5	0	2	1	10
Switzerland (Villars / Tercier) 🔨	0	0	3	2	0	1	0	0	6

Sheet B	1	2	3	4	5	6	7	8	Final
Canada (Joseph / Thiessen)	1	2	0	1	0	1	0	0	5
United States (Uranchimeg / Thums) 🔨	0	0	2	0	1	0	1	2	6

Sheet C	1	2	3	4	5	6	7	8	Final
Latvia (Rožkova / Lasmans) 🔨	2	3	0	1	2	2	1	X	11
Estonia (Riidebach / Mätas)	0	0	2	0	0	0	0	X	2

Sheet D	1	2	3	4	5	6	7	8	Final
Scotland (McKenna / Smith) 🔨	0	0	1	1	1	0	1	1	5
Norway (Iversen / Lorentsen)	2	1	0	0	0	1	0	0	4

== Playoffs ==
Quarterfinals
1	United States	8
8	Japan	9
4	China	8
5	Latvia	4
3	Slovakia	7
6	Italy	8
2	South Korea	7
7	Estonia	4

Semifinals
8	Japan	2
4	China	7
6	Italy	6
2	South Korea	9

Final
4	China	3
2	South Korea	8
Bronze medal game
8	Japan	4
6	Italy	8

=== Quarterfinals ===
Friday, March 15, 10:00 am

Sheet A	1	2	3	4	5	6	7	8	Final
China (Wang / Yang)	0	2	2	1	1	1	1	X	8
Latvia (Rožkova / Lasmans) 🔨	4	0	0	0	0	0	0	X	4

Sheet B	1	2	3	4	5	6	7	8	Final
United States (Uranchimeg / Thums) 🔨	2	0	0	0	4	0	2	0	8
Japan (Ogawa / Nakajima)	0	1	1	1	0	5	0	1	9

Sheet C	1	2	3	4	5	6	7	8	Final
South Korea (Cho / Jeong) 🔨	0	2	0	0	1	0	3	1	7
Estonia (Riidebach / Mätas)	1	0	1	1	0	1	0	0	4

Sheet D	1	2	3	4	5	6	7	8	Final
Slovakia (Kunkelová / Ďuriš) 🔨	1	0	0	5	0	0	1	0	7
Italy (Berto / Ioriatti)	0	2	1	0	1	2	0	2	8

=== Semifinals ===
Friday, March 15, 5:00 pm

Sheet A	1	2	3	4	5	6	7	8	Final
Italy (Berto / Ioriatti) 🔨	1	0	0	0	1	0	4	X	6
South Korea (Cho / Jeong)	0	1	2	1	0	5	0	X	9

Sheet D	1	2	3	4	5	6	7	8	Final
Japan (Ogawa / Nakajima)	0	0	1	0	1	0	0	X	2
China (Wang / Yang) 🔨	1	1	0	3	0	1	1	X	7

=== Bronze medal game ===
Saturday, March 16, 10:00 am

Sheet C	1	2	3	4	5	6	7	8	Final
Japan (Ogawa / Nakajima) 🔨	1	1	0	1	1	0	0	X	4
Italy (Berto / Ioriatti)	0	0	3	0	0	1	4	X	8

=== Final ===
Saturday, March 16, 10:00 am

Sheet B	1	2	3	4	5	6	7	8	Final
China (Wang / Yang)	0	0	1	0	1	0	1	X	3
South Korea (Cho / Jeong) 🔨	2	1	0	2	0	3	0	X	8

== Final standings ==
Place	Team
1st place, gold medalist(s)	South Korea
2nd place, silver medalist(s)	China
3rd place, bronze medalist(s)	Italy
4	Japan
5	United States
6	Slovakia
7	Latvia
8	Estonia
9	England
10	Scotland
11	Finland
12	Denmark
13	Sweden
14	Norway
15	Switzerland
16	Hungary
17	Canada
18	Turkey
19	Poland
20	Spain
21	Slovenia

== See also ==
- 2024 World Wheelchair Curling Championship
