= Yang Jinqiao =

Chinese wheelchair curler (born 2001)

- Curler ♂
- Born: 14 June 2001 (age 25)

Curling career
- Member Association: China
- World Wheelchair Championship: 1 (2023)
- World Wheelchair Mixed Doubles Championship: 2 (2024, 2025)
- Paralympic: 1 (2026)
Medal record
Wheelchair curling
Representing China
Paralympic Games
Gold medal – first place	2026 Milano Cortina	Mixed doubles
World Championship
Gold medal – first place	2023 Richmond	Mixed team
World Mixed Doubles Championships
Silver medal – second place	2024 Gangneung	Mixed doubles

Yang Jinqiao (Chinese: 杨金桥, born 14 June 2001) is a Chinese wheelchair curler. He represented China at the 2026 Winter Paralympics.

== Career ==
Yang competed at the 2023 World Wheelchair Curling Championship and won a gold medal. He then competed at the 2024 World Wheelchair Mixed Doubles Curling Championship and won a silver medal with Wang Meng.

In February 2026, he was selected to represent China at the 2026 Winter Paralympics. He competed in wheelchair curling mixed doubles, an event making its Paralympic debut. China defeated the reigning world champions Japan in seven ends, becoming the first team to win a wheelchair mixed doubles game at the Paralympics. He won a gold medal in the inaugural mixed doubles event.
