= Lee Yong-suk =

South Korean wheelchair curler (born 1984)

- Curler
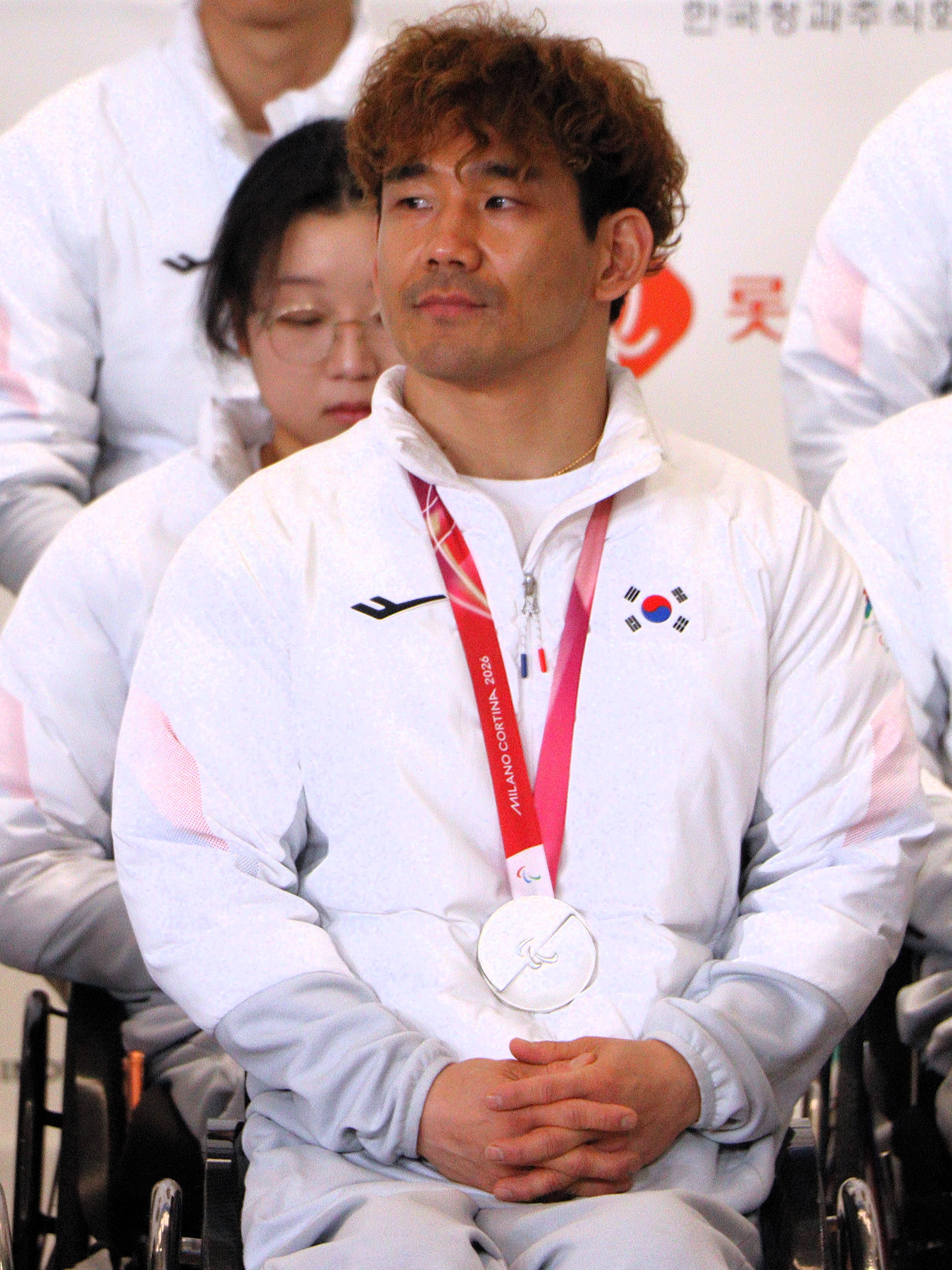
- Lee Yong-suk at 2026
- Born: 26 March 1984 (age 42)

Curling career
- Member Association: South Korea
- Paralympic: 1 (2026)
Medal record
Wheelchair curling
Representing South Korea
Paralympic Games
Silver medal – second place	2026 Milano Cortina	Mixed doubles

Lee Yong-suk (Korean: 이용석; born 26 March 1984) is a South Korean wheelchair curler. He represented South Korea at the 2026 Winter Paralympics.

== Career ==
In January 2026, he competed at the 23rd National Winter Sports Festival and won a gold medal in the mixed doubles event, along with Baek Hye-jin. In February 2026, he was selected to represent South Korea at the 2026 Winter Paralympics. He served as the flagbearer during 2026 Winter Paralympics Parade of Nations. He won a silver medal in the inaugural mixed doubles event. This marked South Korea's first Paralympic medal in wheelchair curling since 2010.
