= Baek Hye-jin =

South Korean wheelchair curler (born 1983)

- Curler
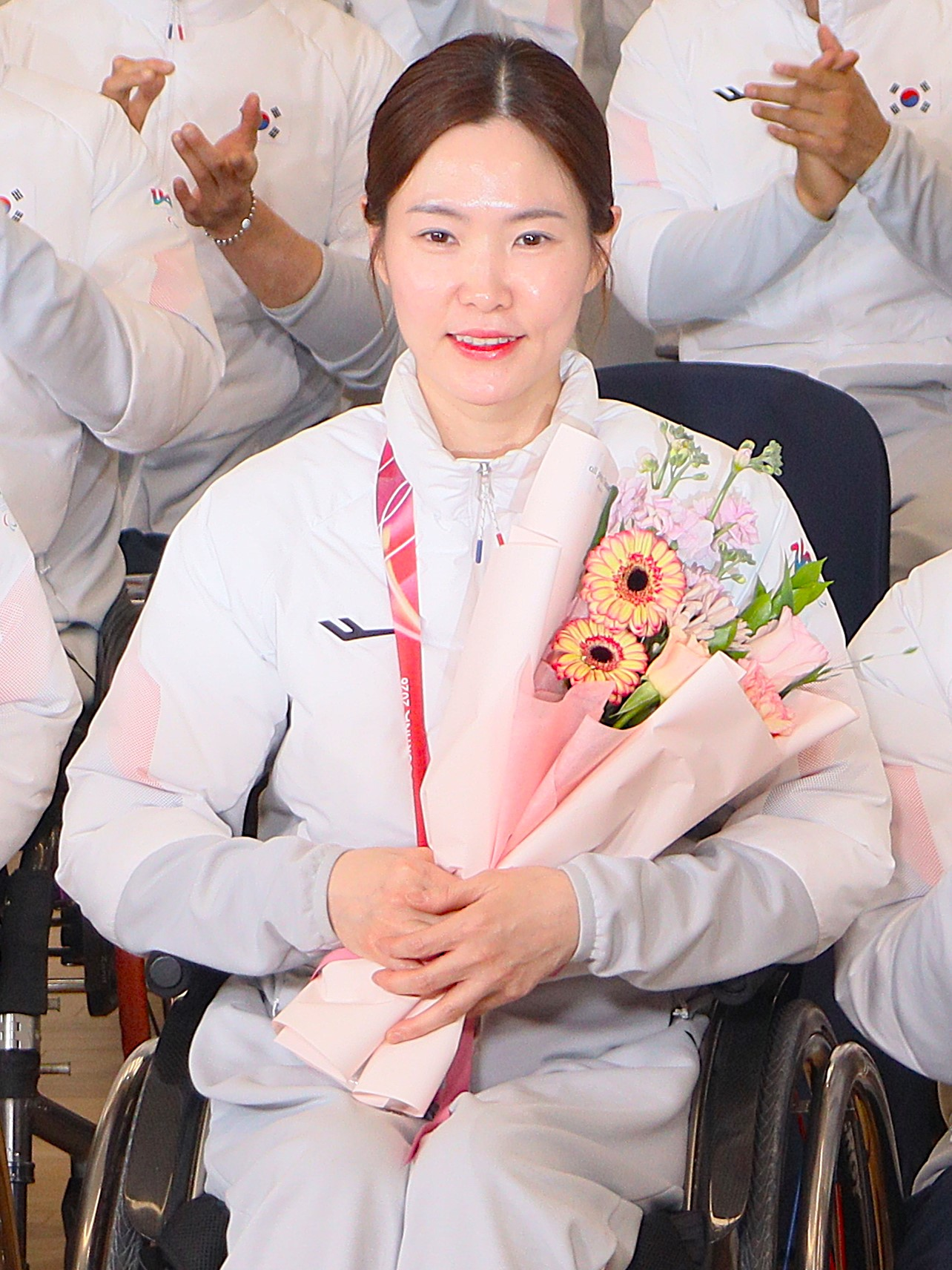
- Born: 2 July 1983 (age 43)

Curling career
- Member Association: South Korea
- World Wheelchair Championship: 1 (2021)
- Paralympic: 2 (2022, 2026)
Medal record
Wheelchair curling
Representing South Korea
Paralympic Games
| Silver medal – second place | 2026 Milano Cortina | Mixed doubles |

Baek Hye-jin (Korean: 백혜진; born 2 July 1983) is a South Korean wheelchair curler. She represented South Korea at the 2022 and 2026 Winter Paralympics.

== Career ==
Baek represented South Korea at the 2022 Winter Paralympics and served as the flagbearer during the 2022 Winter Paralympics Parade of Nations.

In January 2026, she competed at the 23rd National Winter Sports Festival and won a gold medal in the mixed doubles event, along with Lee Yong-suk. In February 2026, she was selected to represent South Korea at the 2026 Winter Paralympics. She won a silver medal in the inaugural mixed doubles event. This marked South Korea's first Paralympic medal in wheelchair curling since 2010.

== Personal life ==
Her husband, Nam Bong-kwang, is also a Paralympic wheelchair curler. The two met and began dating in 2016 and got married in November 2020.
