= Viljo Petersson-Dahl =

Swedish wheelchair curler (born 1982)

- Curler
- Born: 10 November 1982 (age 44)

Team
- Curling club: Jönköpings CK, Jönköping

Curling career
- Member Association: Sweden
- World Wheelchair Championship: 3 (2020, 2024, 2025)
- Paralympic: 3 (2018, 2022, 2026)
Medal record
Wheelchair curling
Representing Sweden
Winter Paralympics
Silver medal – second place	2022 Beijing	Mixed team
Bronze medal – third place	2026 Milano Cortina	Mixed team
World Wheelchair Championship
Bronze medal – third place	2020 Wetzikon

Viljo Jim Martin Pettersson Dahl (born 10 November 1982) is a Swedish wheelchair curler.

He participated in the 2018 Winter Paralympics, where the Swedish team finished in tenth place.

== Teams ==
Season	Skip	Third	Second	Lead	Alternate	Coach	Events
2013–14	Noa Mikael (fourth)	Kristoffer Wadman (skip)	Viljo Petersson-Dahl	Tommy Andersson		Mikael Petersson	SWhCC 2014 (silver)
2014–15	Viljo Petersson-Dahl	Mats-Ola Engborg	Sara Lang	Tommy Andersson	Jenny Sjöstrand	Mikael Petersson	SWhCC 2015 (silver)
2015–16	Viljo Petersson-Dahl	Mats-Ola Engborg	Sara Lang	Tommy Andersson			SWhCC 2016 (silver)
2016–17	Patrik Kallin	Viljo Petersson-Dahl	Ronny Persson	Kristina Ulander	Zandra Reppe	Mia Boman	WWhCC-B 2016 (7th)
2016–17	Viljo Petersson-Dahl	Sara Lang	Mats-Ola Engborg	Tommy Andersson		Mikael Petersson	SWhCC 2017 (bronze)
2017–18	Viljo Petersson-Dahl	Mats-Ola Engborg	Sebastian Blomberg	Tommy Andersson			SWhCC 2018 (gold)
2017–18	Viljo Petersson-Dahl	Ronny Persson	Mats-Ola Engborg	Kristina Ulander	Zandra Reppe	Peter Narup, Mia Boman	WPG 2018 (10th)
2018–19	Viljo Petersson-Dahl	Kristina Ulander	Mats-Ola Engborg	Zandra Reppe	Sebastian Blomberg	Alison Kreviazuk	WWhCC-B 2018 (5th)
2018–19	Viljo Petersson-Dahl	Mats-Ola Engborg	Sebastian Blomberg	Tommy Andersson			SWhCC 2019 (bronze)
2019–20	Viljo Petersson-Dahl	Mats-Ola Engborg	Sebastian Blomberg	Tommy Andersson			SWhCC 2020 (gold)
2019–20	Viljo Petersson-Dahl	Mats-Ola Engborg	Ronny Persson	Kristina Ulander	Zandra Reppe	Alison Kreviazuk	WWhCC-B 2019 (silver); WWhCC 2020 (bronze)
2023–24	Vilko Petersson-Dahl	Ronny Persson	Marcus Holm	Sabina Johansson	Kristina Ulander	Peter Narup	WWhCC 2024 (4th)
2024–25	Vilko Petersson-Dahl	Ronny Persson	Sabina Johansson	Kristina Ulander	Tommy Andersson	Peter Narup	WWhCC 2025 (5th)
