= Agris Lasmans =

Latvian wheelchair curler

- Curler
- Born: 2 June 1979 (age 47); Cēsis, Latvian SSR

Team
- Curling club: Kērlinga klubs Rīga
- Mixed doubles partner: Poļina Rožkova

Curling career
- Member Association: Latvia
- World Wheelchair Championship: 7 (2019, 2020, 2021, 2023, 2024, 2025)
- World Wheelchair Mixed Doubles Championship: 4 (2022, 2023, 2024, 2025)
- Paralympic: 2 (2022, 2026)
Medal record
Wheelchair curling
Representing Latvia
Paralympic Games
| Bronze medal – third place | 2026 Milano Cortina | Mixed doubles |
World Mixed Doubles Championship
| Gold medal – first place | 2023 Richmond |

Agris Lasmans (born 2 June 1979 in Cēsis) is a Latvian wheelchair curler from Riga.

== Career ==
At the international level, as a member of the wheelchair curling team he competed at the 2022 Winter Paralympics (Latvians finished at ninth place) and number of World championships (best result - seventh in 2020). As a member of the wheelchair mixed doubles curling team he and Poļina Rožkova won gold at the 2023 World championship.

At the national wheelchair curling level, he is an eight-time Latvian wheelchair champion curler (2014, 2016, 2017, 2018, 2019, 2020, 2021, 2022).

At the 2026 Winter Paralympics in Italy, Lasmans and Poļina Rožkova become the first athletes representing Latvia to win a medal in the Paralympics after achieving bronze in the mixed doubles curling.

== Wheelchair curling teams ==
| Season | Skip | Third | Second | Lead | Alternate | Coach | Events |
|---|---|---|---|---|---|---|---|
| 2013–14 | Ojārs Briedis | Ilmārs Nicmanis | Agris Lasmans | Poļina Rožkova | | | LWhCC 2014 (gold) |
| 2014–15 | Ojārs Briedis | Poļina Rožkova | Ilmārs Nicmanis | Agris Lasmans | Sergejs Černiševs | Artis Zentelis | WWhCQ 2014 (bronze) |
| 2014–15 | Sergejs Djačenko (fourth) | Agris Lasmans | Ojārs Briedis (skip) | Poļina Rožkova | Kārlis Gabranovs | | LWhCC 2015 (silver) |
| 2015–16 | Maksims Voroņeckis (fourth) | Sergejs Djačenko | Ojārs Briedis (skip) | Poļina Rožkova | Agris Lasmans | | LWhCC 2016 (gold) |
| 2016–17 | Poļina Rožkova (fourth) | Ojārs Briedis (skip) | Ilmārs Nicmanis | Sergejs Djačenko | Agris Lasmans | Pēteris Šveisbergs | WWhBCC 2016 (11th) |
| 2016–17 | Oļegs Lihuta (fourth) | Agris Lasmans | Sergejs Djačenko (ex Černiševs) | Poļina Rožkova (skip) | | Arnis Veidemanis | LWhCC 2017 (gold) |
| 2017–18 | Poļina Rožkova | Sergejs Djačenko | Agris Lasmans | Ojārs Briedis | | Arnis Veidemanis | LWhCC 2018 (gold) |
| 2018–19 | Poļina Rožkova | Sergejs Djačenko | Agris Lasmans | Ojārs Briedis | Vita Miezīte (LWhCC) | Arnis Veidemanis, Signe Rinkule (WWhCC) | WWhBCC 2018 (bronze); LWhCC 2019 (gold); WWhCC 2019 (9th) |
| 2019–20 | Agris Lasmans (fourth) | Sergejs Djačenko | Ojārs Briedis | Poļina Rožkova (skip) | Diāna Dadzīte | Arnis Veidemanis | LWhCC 2020 (gold) |
| 2019–20 | Poļina Rožkova | Sergejs Djačenko | Agris Lasmans | Ojārs Briedis | | Arnis Veidemanis, Rihards Jeske | WWhCC 2020 (7th) |
| 2020–21 | Agris Lasmans (fourth) | Sergejs Djačenko | Ojārs Briedis | Poļina Rožkova (skip) | Diāna Dadzīte | Rihards Jeske, Arnis Veidemanis | LWhCC 2021 (gold) |
| 2020–21 | Poļina Rožkova | Sergejs Djačenko | Agris Lasmans | Ojārs Briedis | Aleksandrs Dimbovskis | Arnis Veidemanis, Rihards Jeske | WWhCC 2021 (8th) |
| 2021–22 | Poļina Rožkova | Sergejs Djačenko | Agris Lasmans | Ojārs Briedis | Aleksandrs Dimbovskis | Arnis Veidemanis, Rihards Jeske | PWG 2022 (9th) |
| 2021–22 | Ojārs Briedis | Agris Lasmans | Sergejs Djačenko | Lība Bērziņa | Ieva Melle | Arnis Veidemanis | LWhCC 2022 (gold) |
| 2022–23 | Sergejs Djačenko (fourth) | Agris Lasmans | Ojārs Briedis (skip) | Ieva Melle | Linda Meijere | Arnis Veidemanis, Rihards Jeske | WWhCC 2023 (9th) |
| 2023–24 | Agris Lasmans (fourth) | Sergejs Djačenko | Ojārs Briedis (skip) | Linda Meijere | Poļina Rožkova | Rihards Jeske | WWhCC 2024 (5th) |
| 2024–25 | Agris Lasmans (fourth) | Sergejs Djačenko | Ojārs Briedis (skip) | Linda Meijere | Poļina Rožkova | Rihards Jeske | WWhCC 2025 (12th) |

=== Mixed doubles ===
| Season | Female | Male | Coach | Events |
|---|---|---|---|---|
| 2021–22 | Poļina Rožkova | Agris Lasmans | | WWhMDCC 2022 (5th) |
| 2022–23 | Poļina Rožkova | Agris Lasmans | Erkki Lill | WWhMDCC 2023 (gold) |
| 2023–24 | Poļina Rožkova | Agris Lasmans | Erkki Lill | WWhMDCC 2024 (7th) |
| 2024–25 | Poļina Rožkova | Agris Lasmans | Erkki Lill | WWhMDCC 2025 (TBD) |
