= Mark Ideson =

Canadian wheelchair curler

- Curler
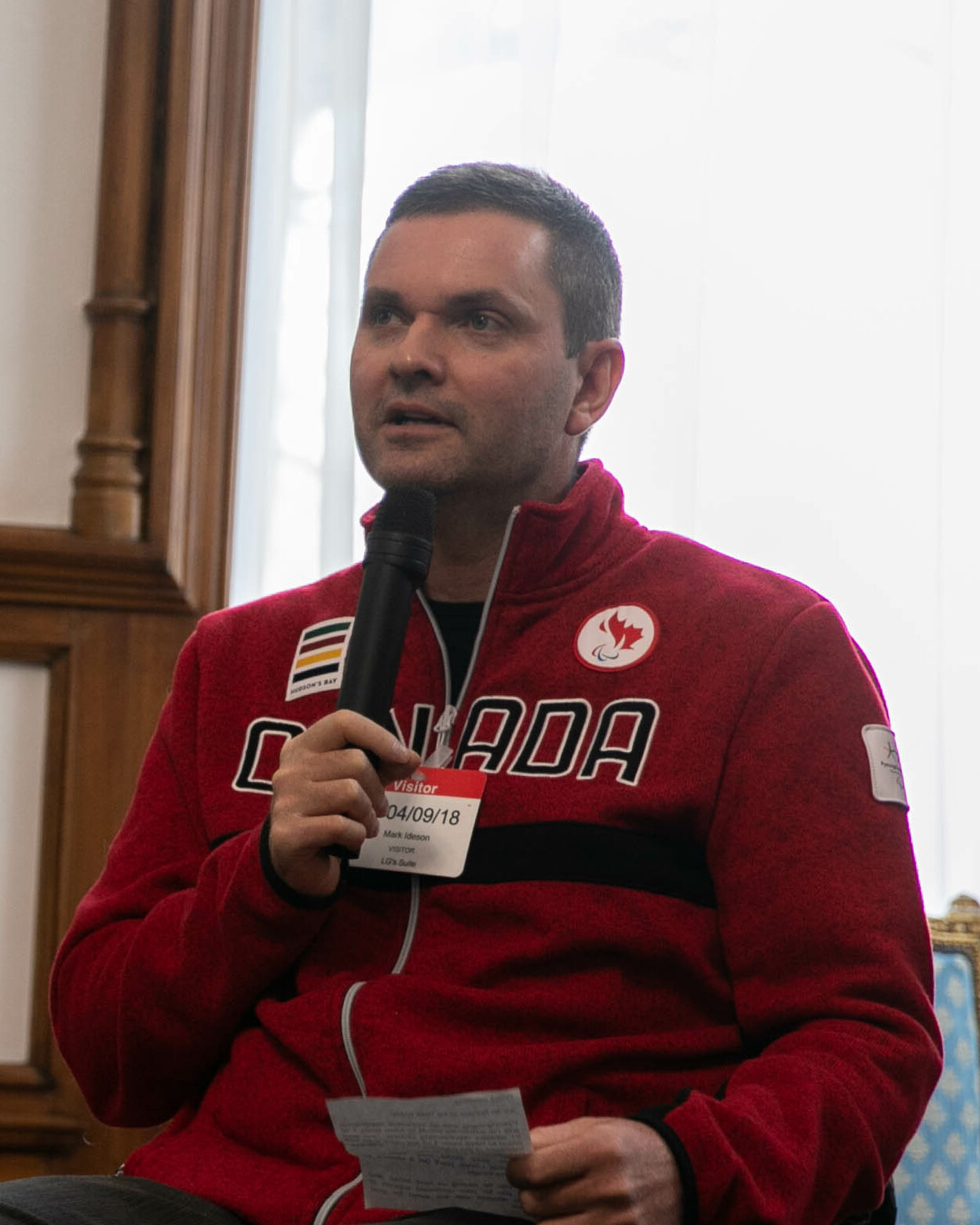
- Ideson in 2018
- Born: April 10, 1976 (age 50); Parry Sound, Ontario, Canada

Curling career
- Paralympic: 4 (2014, 2018, 2022, 2026)
Medal record
Wheelchair curling
Representing Canada
Paralympic Games
| Gold medal – first place | 2014 Sochi | Mixed team |
| Gold medal – first place | 2026 Milano Cortina | Mixed team |
| Bronze medal – third place | 2018 PyeongChang | Mixed team |
| Bronze medal – third place | 2022 Beijing | Mixed team |
World Championships
| Gold medal – first place | 2013 Sochi | Mixed team |
| Silver medal – second place | 2020 Wetzikon | Mixed team |
| Silver medal – second place | 2023 Richmond | Mixed team |
| Silver medal – second place | 2024 Gangneung | Mixed Team |

Mark Ideson (born April 10, 1976, in Parry Sound, Ontario) is a Canadian wheelchair curler who competed in the 2014 Winter Paralympic Games in Sochi and won gold. He is married and has two children. He now resides in London, Ontario. In 2007, the helicopter he was piloting crashed into a field near Cambridge, Ontario, causing injuries that resulted in quadriplegia. He played hockey and golf before he was disabled.

== Personal ==
Ideson is married and has two children, a daughter, Brooklyn, and a son, Myles. He went to the University of Western Ontario. He studied Environmental Science there, where he met his future wife, Lara. He was also a former Western Mustangs Cheerleader. After graduating university, he became a helicopter pilot and was introduced to wheelchair curling in 2010 at the age of 33.

== Accident ==
In 2007, during a maintenance flight, his helicopter crashed into a field near Cambridge, Ontario. He broke 29 bones during the crash. 500 metres away, Daniel Hermann, an eight-year-old boy saw this and went to his mother to call 9-1-1. An ambulance arrived within 20 minutes. In 2014, Ideson said "I had rehearsed for seven years what I was going to say to a kid that essentially saved my life. I could never really put it to words."
