= Poļina Rožkova =

Latvian wheelchair fencer and curler

- Curler
- Born: 12 October 1985 (age 41); Riga, Latvian SSR

Team
- Curling club: Kērlinga klubs Rīga
- Mixed doubles partner: Agris Lasmans

Curling career
- Member Association: Latvia
- World Wheelchair Championship: 5 (2019, 2020, 2021, 2024, 2025)
- Paralympic: 3 (2016 Summer, 2022 Winter, 2026 Winter)
Medal record
Wheelchair curling
Representing Latvia
Paralympic Games
Bronze medal – third place	2026 Milano Cortina	Mixed doubles
World Mixed Doubles Championship
Gold medal – first place	2023 Richmond

Poļina Rožkova (born 12 October 1985 in Riga) is a Latvian wheelchair fencer and wheelchair curler from Riga.

== Career ==
As a wheelchair fencer she competed on 2016 Summer Paralympics in Women's Individual Épée Category A event and finished on sixth place in Pool 1.

At the national wheelchair curling level, she is a seven-time Latvian champion curler.

At the 2026 Winter Paralympics in Italy, Rožkova and Agris Lasmans become the first athletes representing Latvia to win a medal in the Paralympics after achieving bronze in the mixed doubles curling.

== Wheelchair curling teams ==
Season	Skip	Third	Second	Lead	Alternate	Coach	Events
2011–12	Aleksandrs Dimbovskis	Ojārs Briedis	Māris Dzelzkalns	Poļina Rožkova	Vita Miezīte	Artis Zentelis	WWhCQ 2011 (9th)
2012–13	Ojārs Briedis	Poļina Rožkova	Ilmārs Nicmanis	Aleksandrs Dimbovskis	Vita Miezīte	Artis Zentelis	WWhCQ 2012 (4th)
2013–14	Ojārs Briedis	Ilmārs Nicmanis	Agris Lasmans	Poļina Rožkova			LWhCC 2014 (gold)
2014–15	Ojārs Briedis	Poļina Rožkova	Ilmārs Nicmanis	Agris Lasmans	Sergejs Černiševs	Artis Zentelis	WWhCQ 2014 (bronze)
2014–15	Sergejs Djačenko (fourth)	Agris Lasmans	Ojārs Briedis (skip)	Poļina Rožkova	Kārlis Gabranovs		LWhCC 2015 (silver)
2015–16	Maksims Voroņeckis (fourth)	Sergejs Djačenko	Ojārs Briedis (skip)	Poļina Rožkova	Agris Lasmans		LWhCC 2016 (gold)
2016–17	Poļina Rožkova (fourth)	Ojārs Briedis (skip)	Ilmārs Nicmanis	Sergejs Djačenko	Agris Lasmans	Pēteris Šveisbergs	WWhBCC 2016 (11th)
2016–17	Oļegs Lihuta (fourth)	Agris Lasmans	Sergejs Djačenko (ex Černiševs)	Poļina Rožkova (skip)		Arnis Veidemanis	LWhCC 2017 (gold)
2017–18	Poļina Rožkova	Sergejs Djačenko	Agris Lasmans	Ojārs Briedis		Arnis Veidemanis	LWhCC 2018 (gold)
2018–19	Poļina Rožkova	Sergejs Djačenko	Agris Lasmans	Ojārs Briedis	Vita Miezīte (LWhCC)	Arnis Veidemanis, Signe Rinkule (WWhCC)	WWhBCC 2018 (bronze); LWhCC 2019 (gold); WWhCC 2019 (9th)
2019–20	Agris Lasmans (fourth)	Sergejs Djačenko	Ojārs Briedis	Poļina Rožkova (skip)	Diāna Dadzīte	Arnis Veidemanis	LWhCC 2020 (gold)
2019–20	Poļina Rožkova	Sergejs Djačenko	Agris Lasmans	Ojārs Briedis		Arnis Veidemanis, Rihards Jeske	WWhCC 2020 (7th)
2020–21	Agris Lasmans (fourth)	Sergejs Djačenko	Ojārs Briedis	Poļina Rožkova (skip)	Diāna Dadzīte	Rihards Jeske, Arnis Veidemanis	LWhCC 2021 (gold)
2020–21	Poļina Rožkova	Sergejs Djačenko	Agris Lasmans	Ojārs Briedis	Aleksandrs Dimbovskis	Arnis Veidemanis, Rihards Jeske	WWhCC 2021 (8th)
2023–24	Agris Lasmans (fourth)	Sergejs Djačenko	Ojārs Briedis (skip)	Linda Meijere	Poļina Rožkova	Rihards Jeske	WWhCC 2024 (5th)
2024–25	Agris Lasmans (fourth)	Sergejs Djačenko	Ojārs Briedis (skip)	Linda Meijere	Poļina Rožkova	Rihards Jeske	WWhCC 2025 (12th)

=== Mixed doubles ===
Season	Female	Male	Coach	Events
2021–22	Poļina Rožkova	Agris Lasmans		WWhMDCC 2022 (5th)
2022–23	Poļina Rožkova	Agris Lasmans	Erkki Lill	WWhMDCC 2023 (gold)
