= Wang Meng (curler) =

Chinese wheelchair curling player

- Curler ♀
- Born: 2 October 1988 (age 38)

Curling career
- Member Association: China
- World Wheelchair Championship: 1 (2020)
- World Wheelchair Mixed Doubles Championship: 3 (2023, 2024, 2025)
- Paralympic: 2 (2018, 2026)
Medal record
Wheelchair curling
Representing China
Paralympic Games
Gold medal – first place	2018 Pyeongchang	Mixed team
Gold medal – first place	2026 Milano Cortina	Mixed doubles
World Wheelchair Mixed Doubles Championship
Silver medal – second place	2024 Gangneung	Mixed doubles

Wang Meng (Chinese: 王蒙; pinyin: Wáng Méng, born 2 October 1988) is a Chinese wheelchair curling player.

== Career ==
She participated at the 2018 Winter Paralympics and won a gold medal.

She competed at the 2026 Winter Paralympics in wheelchair curling and won a gold medal in the inaugural mixed doubles event.
