= Yang Hui-tae =

South Korean wheelchair curler (born 1968)

- Curler
- Born: 2 August 1968 (age 58)

Curling career
- Member Association: South Korea
- World Wheelchair Championship: 6 (2016, 2019, 2020, 2023, 2024, 2025)
- Paralympic: 1 (2026)
Medal record
Wheelchair curling
Representing South Korea
World Championship
Silver medal – second place	2025 Stevenston	Mixed team
Bronze medal – third place	2016 Lucerne	Mixed team
Bronze medal – third place	2019 Stirling	Mixed team

Yang Hui-tae (Korean: 양희태; born 2 August 1968) is a South Korean wheelchair curler. He represented South Korea at the 2026 Winter Paralympics.

== Career ==
Yang competed at the 2025 World Wheelchair Curling Championship and won a silver medal in the mixed team event, losing to China in the final.

In February 2026, he was selected to represent South Korea at the 2026 Winter Paralympics.
