= Marcus Holm =

Swedish ice sledge hockey player

Marcus Holm (born 5 December 1973) is a Swedish curling player, and is paraplegic.

Holm started at the Paralympics where he was a crosscountry skier, in Lillehammer 1994.

After participating in skiing, Holm then had a successful ice sledge hockey career, where he represented Sweden at the 2010 Winter Paralympics in Vancouver. This was his fifth Winter Paralympics; he also took part in 1998 and 2002, where Sweden took bronze both times, and at the 2006 Winter Paralympics. He also has two World Championships medals; bronze from the 2000 IPC Ice Sledge Hockey World Championships and 2004 IPC Ice Sledge Hockey World Championships. He also played for HIF Kämparna.

Holm, after retiring from ice sledge hockey, started curling on the Swedish national wheelchair curling team, first participating at the 2024 World Wheelchair Curling Championship, where he and teammate Sabina Johansson was first ever world champions in wheelchair mixed doubles curling.
