= 2015 World Wheelchair Curling Championship =

- Host city: Lohja, Finland
- Arena: Kisakallio Sports Institute
- Dates: February 6–13
- Winner: Russia
- Skip: Andrey Smirnov
- Third: Marat Romanov
- Second: Oxana Slesarenko
- Lead: Alexander Shevchenko
- Alternate: Svetlana Pakhomova
- Coach: Anton Batugin
- Finalist: China (Wang Haitao)

The 2015 World Wheelchair Curling Championship was held from February 6 to 13 at the Kisakallio Sports Institute in Lohja, Finland.

== Qualification ==
- Finland (host country)
- Top seven teams from the 2013 World Wheelchair Curling Championship:
  - Canada
  - Sweden
  - China
  - United States
  - Russia
  - Scotland
  - Slovakia
- Two teams from the 2015 WWhCC Qualification Event
  - Norway
  - Germany

=== Qualification event ===
Two teams will qualify for the World Championship from the qualifying event held in November 2014 in Lillehammer, Norway.

== Teams ==
Canada	China	Finland	Germany	Norway
Fourth: Ina Forrest; Third: Dennis Thiessen; Second: Sonja Gaudet; Skip: Mark Ideson; Alternate: Marie Wright; Coach: Joe Rea	Skip: Wang Haitao; Third: Liu Wei; Second: Zhang Qiang; Lead: Xu Guangqin; Alternate: He Jun; Coach: Li Jianrui	Skip: Markku Karjalainen; Third: Sari Karjalainen; Second: Mina Mojtahedi; Lead: Tuomo Aarnikka; Alternate: Vesa Leppanen; Coach: Anne Malmi	Skip: Jens Jäger; Third: Christiane Putzich; Second: Martin Schlitt; Lead: Heike Melchior; Alternate: Robert Hering; Coach: Bernd Weisser	Skip: Rune Lorentsen; Third: Jostein Stordahl; Second: Ole Fredrik Syversen; Lead: Sissel Løchen; Alternate: Gina Kristin Brøndbo; Coach: Per Andreassen
Russia	Scotland	Slovakia	Sweden	United States
Skip: Andrey Smirnov; Third: Marat Romanov; Second: Oxana Slesarenko; Lead: Alexander Shevchenko; Alternate: Svetlana Pakhomova; Coach: Anton Batugin	Skip: Aileen Neilson; Third: Gregor Ewan; Second: Jim Gault; Lead: Angie Malone; Alternate: Hugh Nibloe; Coach: Tony Zummack	Skip: Radoslav Ďuriš; Third: Branislav Jakubec; Second: Dusan Pitoňák; Lead: Monika Kunkelová; Alternate: Imrich Lyócsa; Coach: František Pitoňák	Skip: Jalle Jungnell; Third: Patrik Kallin; Second: Ronny Persson; Lead: Kristina Ulander; Alternate: Zandra Reppe; Coach: Peter Narup	Skip: Patrick McDonald; Third: Steven Emt; Second: Jimmy Joseph; Lead: Penny Greely; Alternate: Meghan Lino; Coach: Steve Brown

== Round robin standings ==
Final Round Robin Standings

Key
Teams to Playoffs

Country	Skip	W	L
Russia	Andrey Smirnov	9	0
China	Wang Haitao	7	2
Finland	Markku Karjalainen	5	4
Slovakia	Radoslav Ďuriš	5	4
United States	Patrick McDonald	4	5
Canada	Mark Ideson	4	5
Germany	Jens Jäger	3	6
Scotland	Aileen Neilson	3	6
Sweden	Jalle Jungnell	3	6
Norway	Rune Lorentsen	2	7

== Round robin results ==
All draw times are listed in Eastern European Time (UTC+02).

=== Draw 1 ===
Saturday, February 7, 17:00

Sheet A	1	2	3	4	5	6	7	8	Final
Sweden (Jungnell) 🔨	2	0	3	2	0	0	0	0	7
Norway (Lorentsen)	0	1	0	0	1	1	2	1	6

Sheet B	1	2	3	4	5	6	7	8	EE	Final
Finland (Karjalainen)	2	0	2	1	0	0	3	0	3	11
Slovakia (Ďuriš) 🔨	0	1	0	0	2	1	0	4	0	8

Sheet C	1	2	3	4	5	6	7	8	Final
China (Wang)	2	0	1	2	0	1	2	X	8
Canada (Ideson) 🔨	0	1	0	0	2	0	0	X	3

Sheet D	1	2	3	4	5	6	7	8	Final
United States (McDonald)	0	0	2	0	1	0	2	0	5
Russia (Smirnov) 🔨	2	1	0	2	0	1	0	4	10

Sheet E	1	2	3	4	5	6	7	8	Final
Scotland (Neilson)	4	3	1	2	2	0	0	X	12
Germany (Jäger)	0	0	0	0	0	1	1	X	2

=== Draw 2 ===
Sunday, February 8, 9:30

Sheet A	1	2	3	4	5	6	7	8	Final
Slovakia (Ďuriš) 🔨	4	0	2	0	0	0	1	0	7
United States (McDonald)	0	3	0	3	1	1	0	1	9

Sheet B	1	2	3	4	5	6	7	8	Final
Norway (Lorentsen)	0	0	1	0	0	0	2	X	3
Russia (Smirnov) 🔨	1	1	0	1	3	2	0	X	8

Sheet C	1	2	3	4	5	6	7	8	Final
Scotland (Neilson)	0	0	0	0	1	1	1	3	6
Sweden (Jungnell) 🔨	0	0	0	2	0	0	0	0	2

Sheet D	1	2	3	4	5	6	7	8	Final
Germany (Jäger)	0	2	0	0	2	1	1	0	6
Canada (Ideson)	0	0	2	1	0	0	0	1	4

Sheet E	1	2	3	4	5	6	7	8	Final
Finland (Karjalainen)	0	1	1	1	0	1	0	X	4
China (Wang) 🔨	3	0	0	0	3	0	2	X	8

=== Draw 3 ===
Sunday, February 8, 15:30

Sheet A	1	2	3	4	5	6	7	8	Final
Canada (Ideson)	2	2	0	1	2	0	1	X	8
Finland (Karjalainen) 🔨	0	0	2	0	0	1	0	X	3

Sheet B	1	2	3	4	5	6	7	8	EE	Final
Sweden (Jungnell) 🔨	0	1	0	1	0	1	0	3	0	6
Germany (Jäger)	1	0	1	0	1	0	3	0	2	8

Sheet C	1	2	3	4	5	6	7	8	Final
Norway (Lorentsen)	0	0	0	1	0	0	0	X	1
United States (McDonald) 🔨	2	1	1	0	1	2	3	X	10

Sheet D	1	2	3	4	5	6	7	8	Final
China (Wang) 🔨	3	0	1	0	0	0	1	1	6
Scotland (Neilson)	0	1	0	3	0	0	0	0	4

Sheet E	1	2	3	4	5	6	7	8	Final
Slovakia (Ďuriš)	0	3	0	1	0	2	0	X	6
Russia (Smirnov)	3	0	3	0	1	0	4	X	11

=== Draw 4 ===
Monday, February 9, 9:30

Sheet A	1	2	3	4	5	6	7	8	Final
Russia (Smirnov) 🔨	1	0	1	0	2	0	2	X	6
Scotland (Neilson)	0	0	0	2	0	1	0	X	3

Sheet B	1	2	3	4	5	6	7	8	Final
China (Wang)	0	1	1	0	0	0	1	0	3
United States (McDonald) 🔨	1	0	0	2	1	1	0	1	6

Sheet C	1	2	3	4	5	6	7	8	Final
Germany (Jäger)	0	1	1	0	0	1	0	X	3
Slovakia (Ďuriš)	4	0	0	2	2	0	3	X	11

Sheet D	1	2	3	4	5	6	7	8	Final
Canada (Ideson) 🔨	1	0	0	3	0	0	1	1	6
Sweden (Jungnell)	0	1	1	0	1	1	0	0	4

Sheet E	1	2	3	4	5	6	7	8	Final
Norway (Lorentsen)	0	1	0	1	0	0	3	0	5
Finland (Karjalainen) 🔨	2	0	1	0	1	1	0	2	7

=== Draw 5 ===
Monday, February 9, 15:30

Sheet A	1	2	3	4	5	6	7	8	Final
China (Wang)	1	2	0	1	0	3	1	X	8
Slovakia (Ďuriš) 🔨	0	0	1	0	2	0	0	X	3

Sheet B	1	2	3	4	5	6	7	8	Final
Scotland (Neilson)	0	1	0	0	0	1	0	0	2
Norway (Lorentsen) 🔨	1	0	0	1	1	0	1	2	6

Sheet C	1	2	3	4	5	6	7	8	Final
Sweden (Jungnell)	0	1	0	1	0	1	0	X	3
Russia (Smirnov) 🔨	2	0	1	0	1	0	1	X	5

Sheet D	1	2	3	4	5	6	7	8	Final
Finland (Karjalainen) 🔨	2	0	0	2	1	1	1	X	7
Germany (Jäger)	0	1	0	0	0	0	0	X	1

Sheet E	1	2	3	4	5	6	7	8	Final
United States (McDonald)	1	0	0	4	0	2	0	2	9
Canada (Ideson) 🔨	0	1	1	0	3	0	3	0	8

=== Draw 6 ===
Tuesday, February 10, 9:30

Sheet A	1	2	3	4	5	6	7	8	Final
Scotland (Neilson)	0	2	1	0	0	0	1	0	4
Canada (Ideson) 🔨	1	0	0	1	1	1	0	2	6

Sheet B	1	2	3	4	5	6	7	8	Final
Slovakia (Ďuriš)	1	0	1	1	1	0	0	2	6
Sweden (Jungnell) 🔨	0	1	0	0	0	2	1	0	4

Sheet C	1	2	3	4	5	6	7	8	EE	Final
United States (McDonald) 🔨	1	0	1	0	0	0	3	1	0	6
Finland (Karjalainen)	0	2	0	2	1	1	0	0	1	7

Sheet D	1	2	3	4	5	6	7	8	EE	Final
Russia (Smirnov) 🔨	0	1	0	1	0	0	1	0	1	4
China (Wang)	0	0	1	0	0	1	0	1	0	3

Sheet E	1	2	3	4	5	6	7	8	Final
Germany (Jäger)	0	1	0	0	0	1	0	X	2
Norway (Lorentsen) 🔨	1	0	1	1	1	0	2	X	6

=== Draw 7 ===
Tuesday, February 10, 15:30

Sheet A	1	2	3	4	5	6	7	8	Final
Finland (Karjalainen)	0	0	0	0	0	3	0	X	3
Russia (Smirnov) 🔨	0	2	1	1	4	0	1	X	9

Sheet B	1	2	3	4	5	6	7	8	Final
Germany (Jäger)	0	0	1	0	1	1	0	X	3
China (Wang) 🔨	0	2	0	4	0	0	2	X	8

Sheet C	1	2	3	4	5	6	7	8	Final
Canada (Ideson)	0	0	1	1	3	1	3	X	9
Norway (Lorentsen) 🔨	1	1	0	0	0	0	0	X	2

Sheet D	1	2	3	4	5	6	7	8	Final
Scotland (Neilson)	0	0	0	2	2	1	0	0	5
Slovakia (Ďuriš) 🔨	2	1	1	0	0	0	1	1	6

Sheet E	1	2	3	4	5	6	7	8	EE	Final
Sweden (Jungnell)	1	0	0	2	1	0	1	1	1	7
United States (McDonald) 🔨	0	3	2	0	0	1	0	0	0	6

=== Draw 8 ===
Wednesday, February 11, 9:30

Sheet A	1	2	3	4	5	6	7	8	Final
Norway (Lorentsen)	0	1	0	0	0	0	0	X	1
China (Wang) 🔨	1	0	0	3	1	0	0	X	5

Sheet B	1	2	3	4	5	6	7	8	Final
United States (McDonald) 🔨	1	0	0	0	0	1	0	X	2
Scotland (Neilson)	0	1	1	0	1	0	1	X	4

Sheet C	1	2	3	4	5	6	7	8	Final
Russia (Smirnov) 🔨	3	2	2	2	1	0	X	X	10
Germany (Jäger)	0	0	0	0	0	1	X	X	1

Sheet D	1	2	3	4	5	6	7	8	Final
Sweden (Jungnell) 🔨	1	0	3	2	0	0	0	2	8
Finland (Karjalainen)	0	1	0	0	1	1	1	0	4

Sheet E	1	2	3	4	5	6	7	8	Final
Canada (Ideson) 🔨	3	0	0	1	0	2	0	0	6
Slovakia (Ďuriš)	0	1	3	0	1	0	1	1	7

=== Draw 9 ===
Wednesday, February 11, 15:30

Sheet A	1	2	3	4	5	6	7	8	Final
United States (McDonald)	0	0	1	2	0	0	2	0	5
Germany (Jäger) 🔨	5	1	0	0	1	2	0	1	10

Sheet B	1	2	3	4	5	6	7	8	Final
Russia (Smirnov)	0	0	0	1	3	0	1	1	6
Canada (Ideson) 🔨	0	2	1	0	0	1	0	0	4

Sheet C	1	2	3	4	5	6	7	8	Final
Finland (Karjalainen) 🔨	2	1	0	1	2	2	0	X	8
Scotland (Neilson)	0	0	2	0	0	0	2	X	4

Sheet D	1	2	3	4	5	6	7	8	Final
Slovakia (Ďuriš) 🔨	0	0	0	0	4	2	2	X	8
Norway (Lorentsen)	1	1	2	1	0	0	0	X	5

Sheet E	1	2	3	4	5	6	7	8	Final
China (Wang)	1	0	0	0	0	4	1	0	6
Sweden (Jungnell) 🔨	0	1	2	0	1	0	0	1	5

=== Relegation Game ===
Thursday, February 12, 15:30

Sheet B	1	2	3	4	5	6	7	8	Final
Scotland (Neilson)	0	0	3	0	0	0	0	X	3
Germany (Jäger) 🔨	0	1	0	1	2	1	1	X	6

Scotland relegated to 2016 World Wheelchair Curling Championship – Qualification Event.

== Playoffs ==
Page playoff system
1	Russia	1
2	China	3
3	Finland	5
4	Slovakia	6

Semifinal
1	Russia	12
4	Slovakia	1

Final
2	China	4
1	Russia	7

Bronze Medal Game
4	Slovakia	5
3	Finland	8

=== 1 vs. 2 ===
Thursday, February 12, 15:30

Sheet D	1	2	3	4	5	6	7	8	Final
Russia (Smirnov) 🔨	0	1	0	0	0	0	0	X	1
China (Wang)	1	0	0	0	0	0	2	X	3

=== 3 vs. 4 ===
Thursday, February 12, 15:30

Sheet A	1	2	3	4	5	6	7	8	EE	Final
Finland (Karjalainen)	0	1	1	1	0	1	0	1	0	5
Slovakia (Ďuriš) 🔨	1	0	0	0	1	0	3	0	1	6

=== Semifinal ===
Friday, February 13, 9:00

Sheet B	1	2	3	4	5	6	7	8	Final
Russia (Smirnov) 🔨	3	1	0	3	2	3	X	X	12
Slovakia (Ďuriš)	0	0	1	0	0	0	X	X	1

=== Bronze medal game ===
Friday, February 13, 14:00

Team	1	2	3	4	5	6	7	8	Final
Slovakia (Ďuriš) 🔨	1	0	2	0	1	0	1	0	5
Finland (Karjalainen)	0	1	0	5	0	1	0	1	8

=== Gold medal game ===
Friday, February 13, 14:00

Team	1	2	3	4	5	6	7	8	Final
China (Wang) 🔨	0	0	1	1	0	1	1	X	4
Russia (Smirnov)	1	3	0	0	3	0	0	X	7

2015 World Wheelchair Curling Championship
(Russia)
Russia
2nd title
