= Scottish Wheelchair Curling Championship =

Curling Competition

The Scottish Wheelchair Curling Championship is the national championship for wheelchair curling in Scotland. The event has been held since 2003.

== Winners ==
| Year | Winning team (in order: skip, third, second, lead, alternate) |
|---|---|
| 2003 | Alex Harvey, Michael McCreadie, Paul Webster, David Telfer |
| 2004 | Frank Duffy, Murray Cran, Frances Lucas, Ross Hatten |
| 2005 | Frank Duffy, Ken Dickson, Murray Cran, Margaret Easton |
| 2006 | Jim Sellar, Angie Malone, Jim Taylor, Angela Higson |
| 2007 | Tom Killin, Aileen Neilson, Jim Elliott, Rosemary Lenton |
| 2008 | Angie Malone, Ian Donaldson, Gill Keith, Jim Taylor |
| 2009 | Michael McCreadie, Aileen Neilson, Jim Elliott, Gerald Pocock |
| 2010 | Aileen Neilson, Michael McCreadie, Tom Killin, Jim Sellar, Angie Malone |
| 2011 | Aileen Neilson, Tom Killin, Ian Donaldson, Michael McCreadie |
| 2012 | Gregor Ewan, Jim Gault, Michael McKenzie, Jackie Cayton |
| 2013 | Aileen Neilson, Robert McPherson, Richard Craig, David Leeson |
| 2014 | Alex Harvey, David Bain, Eddie Flemming, David Telfer |
| 2015 | Gregor Ewan, Jim Gault, Tom Killin, Jim Sellar |
| 2016 | Jim Gault, Tom Killin, Gregor Ewan, Jim Sellar |
| 2017 | Jim Gault, Tom Killin, Debbie McKenna, Jim Sellar |
| 2018 | Jim Gault, Gregor Ewan, Tom Killin, Jim Sellar, Debbie McKenna |
| 2019 | Jim Gault, Gregor Ewan, Stephen McGarry, Gary Logan |
| 2020, 2021 | cancelled due to the ongoing COVID-19 pandemic |
| 2022 | Gregor Ewan, John McClelland, Ian Donaldson |
| 2023 | Gregor Ewan, Jim Gault, Daniel Cowan, Alison Cloudsley |
| 2024 | Paul Webster, David Bain, Gordon Rainey, Alison Hopkins |

== See also ==
- Scottish Men's Curling Championship
- Scottish Women's Curling Championship
- Scottish Mixed Curling Championship
- Scottish Mixed Doubles Curling Championship
- Scottish Junior Curling Championships
- Scottish Senior Curling Championships
- Scottish Schools Curling Championship
