= Xu Guangqin =

Chinese female wheelchair curler and Paralympian

- Curler ♀
- Born: October 29, 1990 (age 36); Heilongjiang

Team
- Curling club: Heilongjiang Provincial Disabled Sport Association, Harbin

Curling career
- Member Association: China
- World Wheelchair Championship: 6 (2009, 2011, 2012, 2013, 2015, 2017)
- Paralympic: 1 (2014)
Medal record
Wheelchair curling
Representing China
World Wheelchair Championship
Silver medal – second place	2015 Lohja
Bronze medal – third place	2012 Chuncheon
Bronze medal – third place	2013 Sochi

Xu Guangqin (Chinese: 徐广芹, born October 29, 1990) is a Chinese wheelchair curler.

She participated in the 2014 Winter Paralympics where Chinese team finished on fourth place.

== Teams ==
Season	Skip	Third	Second	Lead	Alternate	Coach	Events
2007–08	Liu Chunyu	Zhang Qiang	Liu Wei	Xu Guangqin	Liu Yang		WWhCQ 2007 (9th)
2008–09	Wang Haitao	Liu Wei	Xu Guangqin	He Jun	Liu Chunyu	Li Hongchen	WWhCQ 2008 (silver); WWhCC 2009 (8th)
2010–11	Wang Haitao	Liu Wei	Xu Guangqin	He Jun	Zhang Qiang	Li Hongchen	WWhCQ 2010 (gold); WWhCC 2011 (5th)
2011–12	Wang Haitao	Liu Wei	He Jun	Xu Guangqin	Zhang Qiang	Li Jianrui	WWhCC 2012 (bronze)
2012–13	Wang Haitao	Liu Wei	Xu Guangqin	He Jun	Zhang Qiang	Li Jianrui	WWhCC 2013 (bronze)
2013–14	Wang Haitao	Zhang Qiang	Liu Wei	Xu Guangqin	He Jun	Li Jianrui	WPG 2014 (4th)
2014–15	Wang Haitao	Liu Wei	Zhang Qiang	Xu Guangqin	He Jun	Li Jianrui	WWhCC 2015 (silver)
2016–17	Wang Haitao	Liu Wei	Chen Jianxin	Xu Guangqin	Zhang Mingliang	Li Jianrui	WWhCC 2017 (4th)
