= Wang Haitao =

Chinese wheelchair curler

- Curler ♂
- Born: 2 December 1989 (age 36); Harbin, China

Curling career
- World Wheelchair Championship: 12 (2009, 2011, 2012, 2013, 2015, 2017, 2019, 2020, 2021, 2023, 2024, 2025)
- Paralympic: 4 (2014, 2018, 2022, 2026)
Medal record
Wheelchair curling
Representing China
Paralympic Games
Gold medal – first place	2018 PyeongChang	Mixed team
Gold medal – first place	2022 Beijing	Mixed team
Silver medal – second place	2026 Milano Cortina	Mixed team
World Championship
Gold medal – first place	2019 Stirling	Mixed Team
Gold medal – first place	2021 Beijing	Mixed Team
Gold medal – first place	2023 Richmond	Mixed Team
Gold medal – first place	2025 Stevenston	Mixed Team
Silver medal – second place	2015 Lohja	Mixed Team
Bronze medal – third place	2012 Chuncheon	Mixed Team
Bronze medal – third place	2013 Sochi	Mixed Team
Bronze medal – third place	2024 Gangneung	Mixed Team

Wang Haitao (Chinese: 王海涛; Chinese: 王海濤; pinyin: wáng hǎi tāo，born 2 December 1989) is a Chinese wheelchair curler. He participated at the 2014, 2018 Winter Paralympics and 2022 Winter Paralympics, winning two gold medals in 2018 and 2022.

== Career ==
He participated in several editions of World Wheelchair Curling Championships, and won two bronze, one silver medal, and most recently won the 2021 World Wheelchair Curling Championship, in addition to winning the 2022 Winter Paralympics gold medal.

== Teams ==
Season	Skip	Third	Second	Lead	Alternate	Coach	Events
2008–09	Wang Haitao	Liu Wei	Xu Guangqin	He Jun	Li Chunyu	Li Hongchen	WWhCCQ 2009 (2rd) (silver); WWhCC 2009 (5th)
2010–11	Wang Haitao	Liu Wei	Xu Guangqin	He Jun	Zhang Qiang	Li Hongchen	WWhCCQ 2011 (1st) (gold); WWhCC 2011 (5th)
2011–12	Wang Haitao	Liu Wei	He Jun	Xu Guangqin	Zhang Qiang	Li Jianrui	WWhCC 2012 (bronze)
2012–13	Wang Haitao	Liu Wei	Xu Guangqin	He Jun	Zhang Qiang	Li Hongchen	WWhCC 2013 (bronze)
2013–14	Wang Haitao	Zhang Qiang	Liu Wei	Xu Guangqin	He Jun	Li Jianrui	PWG 2014 (4th)
2014–15	Wang Haitao	Liu Wei	Zhang Qiang	Xu Guangqin	He Jun	Li Jianrui	WWhCC 2015 (silver)
2016–17	Wang Haitao	Liu Wei	Chen Jianxin	Xu Guangqin	Zhang Mingliang	Li Jianrui	WWhCC 2017 (4th)
2017–18	Wang Haitao	Chen Jianxin	Liu Wei	Wang Meng	Zhang Qiang	Yue Qingshuang	PWG 2018 (gold)
2018–19	Wang Haitao	Zhang Mingliang	Xu Xinchen	Yan Zhuo	Zhang Qiang	Li Jianrui	WWhCC 2019 (gold)
2019–20	Wang Haitao	Chen Jianxin	Liu Wei	Wang Meng	Zhang Mingliang	Li Jianrui	WWhCC 2020 (4th)
2021–22	Wang Haitao	Chen Jianxin	Zhang Mingliang	Yan Zhuo	Sun Yulong	Yue Qingshuang	WWhCC 2021 (gold); PWG 2022 (gold)
2022–23	Wang Haitao	Zhang Shuaiyu	Yang Jinqiao	Li Nana	Zhang Mingliang	Yue Qingshuang	WWhCC 2023 (gold)
2023–24	Wang Haitao	Zhang Shuaiyu	Zhang Qiang	Yan Zhuo	Peng Bing	Yue Qingshuang	WWhCC 2024 (bronze)
2024–25	Wang Haitao	Chen Jianxin	Zhang Mingliang	Li Nana	Zhang Qiang	Yue Qingshuang	WWhCC 2025 (gold)

Paralympics
Preceded by None	Flagbearer for China at the Paralympics closing ceremony (South Korea) Pyeongchang 2018	Succeeded by Yang Hongqiong
