= Michael McKenzie (curler) =

Scottish wheelchair curler

- Curler ♂

Curling career
- Member Association: Scotland
- World Wheelchair Championship: 1 (2009)
Medal record
Wheelchair curling
World Wheelchair Championship
Bronze medal – third place	2011 Prague
Scottish Wheelchair Championship
Gold medal – first place	2012

Michael McKenzie is a Scottish wheelchair curler.

At the international level, he is a 2011 World bronze medallist.

At the national level, he is a 2012 Scottish wheelchair champion curler.

== Teams ==
Season	Skip	Third	Second	Lead	Alternate	Coach	Events
2010–11	Aileen Neilson	Tom Killin	Gregor Ewan	Angie Malone	Michael McKenzie	Sheila Swan	WWhCC 2011 (bronze)
2011–12	Gregor Ewan	Jim Gault	Michael McKenzie	Jackie Cayton			SWhCC 2012 (gold)
