= 2012 World Wheelchair Curling Championship =

- Host city: Chuncheon City, South Korea
- Arena: Uiam Ice Rink
- Dates: February 18–25
- Winner: Russia
- Skip: Andrey Smirnov
- Third: Marat Romanov
- Second: Aleksandr Shevchenko
- Lead: Svetlana Pakhomova
- Alternate: Oxana Slesarenko
- Coach: Margarita Nesterova
- Finalist: South Korea (Kim Hak-sung)

The 2012 World Wheelchair Curling Championship was held from February 18 to 25 at the Uiam Ice Rink in Chuncheon City, South Korea.

== Qualification ==
- South Korea (host country)
- Top seven teams from the 2011 World Wheelchair Curling Championship:
  - Canada
  - Norway
  - Scotland
  - Russia
  - China
  - United States
  - Sweden (winner of the challenge games)
- Two teams from the 2012 WWhCC Qualification Event
  - Slovakia
  - Italy

=== Qualification event ===
Slovakia and Italy qualified from the qualifying event held in November 2011 in Lohja, Finland.

== Teams ==
The following 10 teams participated in the championship:

| Canada | China | Italy | Norway | Russia |
|---|---|---|---|---|
| Skip: Darryl Neighbour Third: Ina Forrest; Second: Jack Smart; Lead: Sonja Gaudet; Alternate: Jim Armstrong; Coach: Joe Rea | Skip: Wang Haitao Third: Liu Wei; Second: He Jun; Lead: Xu Guangqin; Alternate: Zhang Qiang; Coach: Li Jianrui | Skip: Andrea Tabanelli Third: Egidio Marchese; Second: Emanuele Spelorzi; Lead: Angela Menardi; Alternate: Rosanna Menazzi; Coach: Giulo Regli | Skip: Rune Lorentsen Third: Jostein Stordahl; Second: Terje Rafdal; Lead: Sissel Løchen; Alternate: Per Fagerhøi; Coach: Thoralf Hognestad | Skip: Andrey Smirnov Third: Marat Romanov; Second: Aleksandr Shevchenko; Lead: Svetlana Pakhomova; Alternate: Oxana Slesarenko; Coach: Margarita Nesterova |
| Scotland | Slovakia | South Korea | Sweden | United States |
| Skip: Aileen Neilson Third: Tom Killin; Second: Gregor Ewan; Lead: Angela Malone; Alternate: Jim Gault; Coach: Tony Zummack | Skip: Radoslav Duris Third: Branislav Jakubec; Second: Dušan Pitoňák; Lead: Monika Kunkelová; Alternate: Alena Kánová; Coach: Frantisek Pitoňák | Skip: Kim Hak-sung Third: Jung Seung-won; Second: Noh Byeong-il; Lead: Kang Mi-suk; Alternate: Bang Min-ja; Coach: Park Kwon-il | Skip: Jalle Jungnell Third: Glenn Ikonen; Second: Patrik Kallin; Lead: Anette Wilhelm; Alternate: Gert Erlandsson; Coach: Tomas Nordin | Skip: Patrick McDonald Third: David Palmer; Second: James Joseph; Lead: Penny Greely; Alternate: Timothy Kelly; Coach: Steve Brown |

== Round-robin standings ==
Final round-robin standings

Key
| Teams to Playoffs |
| Teams to Tiebreaker |

| Nation | Skip | W | L |
|---|---|---|---|
| China | Wang Haitao | 7 | 2 |
| Russia | Andrey Smirnov | 7 | 2 |
| South Korea | Kim Hak-sung | 7 | 2 |
| United States | Patrick McDonald | 6 | 3 |
| Slovakia | Radoslav Duris | 6 | 3 |
| Canada | Darryl Neighbour | 3 | 6 |
| Scotland | Aileen Neilson | 3 | 6 |
| Sweden | Jalle Jungnell | 3 | 6 |
| Norway | Rune Lorentsen | 2 | 7 |
| Italy | Andrea Tabanelli | 1 | 8 |

== Round-robin results ==
All times listed in Korea Standard Time (UTC+09).

=== Draw 1 ===
Sunday, February 19, 9:30

| Sheet A | 1 | 2 | 3 | 4 | 5 | 6 | 7 | 8 | Final |
| Italy (Tabanelli) | 0 | 2 | 1 | 0 | 1 | 0 | 0 | X | 4 |
| Canada (Neighbour) 🔨 | 2 | 0 | 0 | 2 | 0 | 2 | 1 | X | 7 |

| Sheet B | 1 | 2 | 3 | 4 | 5 | 6 | 7 | 8 | Final |
| China (Wang) 🔨 | 0 | 3 | 0 | 1 | 0 | 1 | 0 | 1 | 6 |
| Scotland (Neilson) | 1 | 0 | 1 | 0 | 1 | 0 | 2 | 0 | 5 |

| Sheet C | 1 | 2 | 3 | 4 | 5 | 6 | 7 | 8 | Final |
| South Korea (Kim) 🔨 | 0 | 1 | 1 | 0 | 0 | 0 | 4 | 0 | 6 |
| United States (McDonald) | 3 | 0 | 0 | 1 | 1 | 1 | 0 | 1 | 7 |

| Sheet D | 1 | 2 | 3 | 4 | 5 | 6 | 7 | 8 | Final |
| Slovakia (Duris) 🔨 | 2 | 0 | 1 | 4 | 0 | 0 | 2 | 0 | 9 |
| Norway (Lorentsen) | 0 | 1 | 0 | 0 | 1 | 5 | 0 | 1 | 8 |

| Sheet E | 1 | 2 | 3 | 4 | 5 | 6 | 7 | 8 | Final |
| Russia (Smirnov) | 0 | 0 | 2 | 0 | 2 | 5 | 0 | X | 9 |
| Sweden (Jungnell) 🔨 | 0 | 1 | 0 | 1 | 0 | 0 | 1 | X | 3 |

=== Draw 2 ===
Sunday, February 19, 15:30

| Sheet A | 1 | 2 | 3 | 4 | 5 | 6 | 7 | 8 | Final |
| Russia (Smirnov) 🔨 | 1 | 1 | 1 | 0 | 0 | 0 | 1 | X | 4 |
| China (Wang) | 0 | 0 | 0 | 1 | 0 | 0 | 0 | X | 1 |

| Sheet B | 1 | 2 | 3 | 4 | 5 | 6 | 7 | 8 | Final |
| United States (McDonald) | 0 | 1 | 0 | 1 | 0 | 1 | 1 | 0 | 4 |
| Sweden (Jungnell) 🔨 | 1 | 0 | 1 | 0 | 1 | 0 | 0 | 0 | 3 |

| Sheet C | 1 | 2 | 3 | 4 | 5 | 6 | 7 | 8 | Final |
| Italy (Tabanelli) 🔨 | 1 | 0 | 0 | 0 | 0 | 0 | 0 | X | 1 |
| Slovakia (Duris) | 0 | 2 | 1 | 1 | 3 | 1 | 2 | X | 10 |

| Sheet D | 1 | 2 | 3 | 4 | 5 | 6 | 7 | 8 | Final |
| South Korea (Kim) 🔨 | 2 | 0 | 2 | 0 | 2 | 1 | X | X | 7 |
| Canada (Neighbour) | 0 | 0 | 0 | 1 | 0 | 0 | X | X | 1 |

| Sheet E | 1 | 2 | 3 | 4 | 5 | 6 | 7 | 8 | EE | Final |
| Scotland (Neilson) | 1 | 0 | 3 | 1 | 0 | 0 | 0 | 1 | 2 | 8 |
| Norway (Lorentsen) 🔨 | 0 | 2 | 0 | 0 | 2 | 1 | 1 | 0 | 0 | 6 |

=== Draw 3 ===
Monday, February 20, 9:30

| Sheet A | 1 | 2 | 3 | 4 | 5 | 6 | 7 | 8 | Final |
| Norway (Lorentsen) | 0 | 1 | 0 | 1 | 0 | 1 | 0 | X | 3 |
| Sweden (Jungnell) 🔨 | 1 | 0 | 2 | 0 | 1 | 0 | 2 | X | 6 |

| Sheet B | 1 | 2 | 3 | 4 | 5 | 6 | 7 | 8 | Final |
| Canada (Neighbour) | 0 | 0 | 1 | 0 | 0 | 1 | 0 | 2 | 4 |
| Slovakia (Duris) 🔨 | 1 | 1 | 0 | 1 | 1 | 0 | 1 | 0 | 5 |

| Sheet C | 1 | 2 | 3 | 4 | 5 | 6 | 7 | 8 | Final |
| Scotland (Neilson) 🔨 | 0 | 0 | 0 | 0 | 0 | 1 | 1 | 2 | 4 |
| Russia (Smirnov) | 0 | 0 | 0 | 1 | 0 | 0 | 0 | 0 | 1 |

| Sheet D | 1 | 2 | 3 | 4 | 5 | 6 | 7 | 8 | Final |
| United States (McDonald) 🔨 | 3 | 0 | 1 | 2 | 1 | 0 | 1 | X | 8 |
| Italy (Tabanelli) | 0 | 2 | 0 | 0 | 0 | 1 | 0 | X | 3 |

| Sheet E | 1 | 2 | 3 | 4 | 5 | 6 | 7 | 8 | Final |
| South Korea (Kim) | 0 | 1 | 2 | 0 | 0 | 0 | 0 | 0 | 3 |
| China (Wang) 🔨 | 1 | 0 | 0 | 0 | 0 | 0 | 2 | 2 | 5 |

=== Draw 4 ===
Monday, February 20, 15:30

| Sheet A | 1 | 2 | 3 | 4 | 5 | 6 | 7 | 8 | Final |
| Canada (Neighbour) | 1 | 0 | 1 | 2 | 0 | 4 | X | X | 8 |
| Scotland (Neilson) 🔨 | 0 | 1 | 0 | 0 | 1 | 0 | X | X | 2 |

| Sheet B | 1 | 2 | 3 | 4 | 5 | 6 | 7 | 8 | Final |
| South Korea (Kim) | 0 | 3 | 0 | 0 | 2 | 0 | 0 | 2 | 7 |
| Italy (Tabanelli) 🔨 | 1 | 0 | 1 | 1 | 0 | 1 | 2 | 0 | 6 |

| Sheet C | 1 | 2 | 3 | 4 | 5 | 6 | 7 | 8 | Final |
| China (Wang) 🔨 | 0 | 0 | 1 | 2 | 0 | 1 | 1 | X | 5 |
| Sweden (Jungnell) | 0 | 1 | 0 | 0 | 1 | 0 | 0 | X | 2 |

| Sheet D | 1 | 2 | 3 | 4 | 5 | 6 | 7 | 8 | Final |
| Norway (Lorentsen) 🔨 | 3 | 1 | 1 | 2 | 0 | 0 | 0 | 0 | 7 |
| Russia (Smirnov) | 0 | 0 | 0 | 0 | 3 | 1 | 3 | 1 | 8 |

| Sheet E | 1 | 2 | 3 | 4 | 5 | 6 | 7 | 8 | Final |
| Slovakia (Duris) | 0 | 0 | 1 | 0 | 0 | 1 | X | X | 2 |
| United States (McDonald) 🔨 | 3 | 1 | 0 | 2 | 2 | 0 | X | X | 8 |

=== Draw 5 ===
Tuesday, February 21, 9:30

| Sheet A | 1 | 2 | 3 | 4 | 5 | 6 | 7 | 8 | Final |
| South Korea (Kim) 🔨 | 3 | 0 | 3 | 1 | 1 | 1 | 0 | X | 9 |
| Russia (Smirnov) | 0 | 1 | 0 | 0 | 0 | 0 | 0 | X | 1 |

| Sheet B | 1 | 2 | 3 | 4 | 5 | 6 | 7 | 8 | Final |
| Scotland (Neilson) | 0 | 1 | 0 | 3 | 0 | 0 | 0 | X | 4 |
| United States (McDonald) 🔨 | 2 | 0 | 1 | 0 | 1 | 0 | 2 | X | 6 |

| Sheet C | 1 | 2 | 3 | 4 | 5 | 6 | 7 | 8 | Final |
| Canada (Neighbour) 🔨 | 0 | 0 | 2 | 1 | 0 | 1 | 1 | 0 | 5 |
| Norway (Lorentsen) | 3 | 0 | 0 | 0 | 2 | 0 | 0 | 1 | 6 |

| Sheet D | 1 | 2 | 3 | 4 | 5 | 6 | 7 | 8 | Final |
| China (Wang) 🔨 | 2 | 0 | 0 | 2 | 0 | 0 | 1 | 0 | 5 |
| Slovakia (Duris) | 0 | 1 | 1 | 0 | 1 | 0 | 0 | 3 | 6 |

| Sheet E | 1 | 2 | 3 | 4 | 5 | 6 | 7 | 8 | Final |
| Sweden (Jungnell) | 0 | 0 | 0 | 0 | 1 | 1 | 1 | 0 | 3 |
| Italy (Tabanelli) 🔨 | 2 | 2 | 0 | 1 | 0 | 0 | 0 | 1 | 6 |

=== Draw 6 ===
Tuesday, February 21, 15:30

| Sheet A | 1 | 2 | 3 | 4 | 5 | 6 | 7 | 8 | Final |
| Sweden (Jungnell) 🔨 | 1 | 0 | 0 | 3 | 1 | 0 | 0 | 0 | 5 |
| Slovakia (Duris) | 0 | 0 | 1 | 0 | 0 | 2 | 1 | 2 | 6 |

| Sheet B | 1 | 2 | 3 | 4 | 5 | 6 | 7 | 8 | Final |
| Italy (Tabanelli) 🔨 | 1 | 0 | 0 | 3 | 0 | 1 | 0 | X | 5 |
| Norway (Lorentsen) | 0 | 2 | 1 | 0 | 2 | 0 | 3 | X | 8 |

| Sheet C | 1 | 2 | 3 | 4 | 5 | 6 | 7 | 8 | Final |
| United States (McDonald) 🔨 | 1 | 0 | 1 | 0 | 0 | 1 | 0 | 0 | 3 |
| China (Wang) | 0 | 1 | 0 | 0 | 1 | 0 | 3 | 2 | 7 |

| Sheet D | 1 | 2 | 3 | 4 | 5 | 6 | 7 | 8 | Final |
| Scotland (Neilson) | 0 | 0 | 0 | 2 | 0 | 0 | 0 | X | 2 |
| South Korea (Kim) 🔨 | 1 | 2 | 1 | 0 | 2 | 1 | 2 | X | 9 |

| Sheet E | 1 | 2 | 3 | 4 | 5 | 6 | 7 | 8 | Final |
| Canada (Neighbour) | 1 | 0 | 0 | 0 | 2 | 0 | 0 | 0 | 3 |
| Russia (Smirnov) 🔨 | 0 | 0 | 1 | 1 | 0 | 3 | 0 | 2 | 7 |

=== Draw 7 ===
Wednesday, February 22, 9:30

| Sheet A | 1 | 2 | 3 | 4 | 5 | 6 | 7 | 8 | Final |
| China (Wang) | 1 | 1 | 0 | 4 | 2 | 0 | 0 | X | 8 |
| Italy (Tabanelli) 🔨 | 0 | 0 | 1 | 0 | 0 | 1 | 1 | X | 3 |

| Sheet B | 1 | 2 | 3 | 4 | 5 | 6 | 7 | 8 | Final |
| Sweden (Jungnell) | 0 | 1 | 2 | 1 | 3 | 1 | X | X | 8 |
| Canada (Armstrong) 🔨 | 1 | 0 | 0 | 0 | 0 | 0 | X | X | 1 |

| Sheet C | 1 | 2 | 3 | 4 | 5 | 6 | 7 | 8 | Final |
| Slovakia (Duris) 🔨 | 1 | 0 | 2 | 0 | 1 | 1 | 0 | 0 | 5 |
| Scotland (Neilson) | 0 | 0 | 0 | 2 | 0 | 0 | 1 | 1 | 4 |

| Sheet D | 1 | 2 | 3 | 4 | 5 | 6 | 7 | 8 | Final |
| Russia (Smirnov) | 0 | 0 | 0 | 2 | 0 | 0 | 0 | 1 | 3 |
| United States (McDonald) 🔨 | 0 | 0 | 1 | 0 | 1 | 0 | 0 | 0 | 2 |

| Sheet E | 1 | 2 | 3 | 4 | 5 | 6 | 7 | 8 | Final |
| Norway (Lorentsen) | 0 | 0 | 1 | 0 | 0 | 0 | 1 | X | 2 |
| South Korea (Kim) 🔨 | 0 | 1 | 0 | 1 | 2 | 2 | 0 | X | 6 |

=== Draw 8 ===
Wednesday, February 22, 15:30

| Sheet A | 1 | 2 | 3 | 4 | 5 | 6 | 7 | 8 | Final |
| United States (McDonald) | 0 | 0 | 2 | 1 | 1 | 2 | 1 | X | 7 |
| Norway (Lorentsen) 🔨 | 2 | 1 | 0 | 0 | 0 | 0 | 0 | X | 3 |

| Sheet B | 1 | 2 | 3 | 4 | 5 | 6 | 7 | 8 | Final |
| Slovakia (Duris) | 1 | 0 | 1 | 0 | 0 | 0 | 2 | X | 4 |
| Russia (Smirnov) 🔨 | 0 | 0 | 0 | 2 | 2 | 3 | 0 | X | 7 |

| Sheet C | 1 | 2 | 3 | 4 | 5 | 6 | 7 | 8 | Final |
| Sweden (Jungnell) | 3 | 0 | 1 | 0 | 3 | 0 | 0 | X | 7 |
| South Korea (Kim) 🔨 | 0 | 2 | 0 | 3 | 0 | 3 | 2 | X | 10 |

| Sheet D | 1 | 2 | 3 | 4 | 5 | 6 | 7 | 8 | Final |
| Canada (Neighbour) | 0 | 0 | 2 | 0 | 0 | 0 | X | X | 2 |
| China (Wang) 🔨 | 2 | 1 | 0 | 1 | 2 | 1 | X | X | 7 |

| Sheet E | 1 | 2 | 3 | 4 | 5 | 6 | 7 | 8 | Final |
| Italy (Tabanelli) 🔨 | 0 | 0 | 0 | 0 | 0 | X | X | X | 0 |
| Scotland (Neilson) | 2 | 3 | 3 | 1 | 0 | X | X | X | 10 |

=== Draw 9 ===
Thursday, February 23, 9:00

| Sheet A | 1 | 2 | 3 | 4 | 5 | 6 | 7 | 8 | Final |
| Slovakia (Duris) | 0 | 1 | 0 | 1 | 0 | 1 | 0 | X | 3 |
| South Korea (Kim) 🔨 | 4 | 0 | 3 | 0 | 4 | 0 | 3 | X | 14 |

| Sheet B | 1 | 2 | 3 | 4 | 5 | 6 | 7 | 8 | Final |
| Norway (Lorentsen) 🔨 | 1 | 0 | 0 | 0 | 0 | 2 | 0 | X | 3 |
| China (Wang) | 0 | 1 | 0 | 1 | 3 | 0 | 1 | X | 6 |

| Sheet C | 1 | 2 | 3 | 4 | 5 | 6 | 7 | 8 | Final |
| Russia (Smirnov) 🔨 | 1 | 0 | 2 | 0 | 2 | 1 | 1 | X | 7 |
| Italy (Tabanelli) | 0 | 3 | 0 | 1 | 0 | 0 | 0 | X | 4 |

| Sheet D | 1 | 2 | 3 | 4 | 5 | 6 | 7 | 8 | Final |
| Sweden (Jungnell) | 1 | 2 | 0 | 1 | 3 | 0 | 0 | 1 | 8 |
| Scotland (Neilson) 🔨 | 0 | 0 | 1 | 0 | 0 | 2 | 1 | 0 | 4 |

| Sheet E | 1 | 2 | 3 | 4 | 5 | 6 | 7 | 8 | EE | Final |
| United States (McDonald) | 1 | 1 | 1 | 0 | 0 | 1 | 1 | 0 | 0 | 5 |
| Canada (Neighbour) 🔨 | 0 | 0 | 0 | 2 | 2 | 0 | 0 | 1 | 2 | 7 |

== Tiebreaker ==
Thursday, February 23, 14:30

| Sheet D | 1 | 2 | 3 | 4 | 5 | 6 | 7 | 8 | EE | Final |
| United States (McDonald) 🔨 | 0 | 0 | 2 | 1 | 1 | 0 | 1 | 0 | 0 | 5 |
| Slovakia (Duris) | 2 | 1 | 0 | 0 | 0 | 1 | 0 | 1 | 2 | 7 |

== Playoffs ==
Page playoff system
1 | South Korea | 5
2 | Russia | 4
3 | China | 7
4 | Slovakia | 2

Semifinal
2 | Russia | 3
3 | China | 2

Gold Medal Game
1 | South Korea | 1
2 | Russia | 9

| Bronze Medal Game |
| 3 | China | 7 |
| 4 | Slovakia | 4 |

=== 1 vs. 2 Game ===
Friday, February 24, 9:30

| Sheet D | 1 | 2 | 3 | 4 | 5 | 6 | 7 | 8 | EE | Final |
| South Korea (Kim) 🔨 | 1 | 0 | 2 | 0 | 0 | 0 | 0 | 1 | 1 | 5 |
| Russia (Smirnov) | 0 | 2 | 0 | 0 | 0 | 1 | 1 | 0 | 0 | 4 |

=== 3 vs. 4 Game ===
Friday, February 24, 9:30

| Sheet B | 1 | 2 | 3 | 4 | 5 | 6 | 7 | 8 | Final |
| China (Wang) 🔨 | 2 | 1 | 0 | 4 | 0 | 0 | 0 | X | 7 |
| Slovakia (Duris) | 0 | 0 | 1 | 0 | 0 | 0 | 1 | X | 2 |

=== Semifinal ===
Friday, February 24, 15:30

| Sheet C | 1 | 2 | 3 | 4 | 5 | 6 | 7 | 8 | Final |
| Russia (Smirnov) 🔨 | 0 | 1 | 1 | 0 | 0 | 0 | 1 | 0 | 3 |
| China (Wang) | 0 | 0 | 0 | 0 | 0 | 1 | 0 | 1 | 2 |

=== Bronze medal game ===
Saturday, February 25, 10:00

| Sheet C | 1 | 2 | 3 | 4 | 5 | 6 | 7 | 8 | Final |
| China (Wang) 🔨 | 0 | 2 | 0 | 2 | 3 | 0 | 0 | X | 7 |
| Slovakia (Duris) | 1 | 0 | 1 | 0 | 0 | 0 | 2 | X | 4 |

=== Gold medal game ===
Saturday, February 25, 14:00

| Sheet C | 1 | 2 | 3 | 4 | 5 | 6 | 7 | 8 | Final |
| South Korea (Kim) 🔨 | 1 | 0 | 0 | 0 | 0 | 0 | 0 | X | 1 |
| Russia (Smirnov) | 0 | 1 | 3 | 2 | 1 | 1 | 1 | X | 9 |

2012 World Wheelchair Curling Championship
(Russia)
Russia
1st title
