= Xu Xinchen =

Chinese male wheelchair curler

- Curler ♂

Curling career
- Member Association: China
- World Wheelchair Championship: 1 (2019)
Medal record
Wheelchair curling
World Wheelchair Championship
Gold medal – first place	2019 Stirling

Xu Xinchen ( Chinese: 徐新臣) is a Chinese wheelchair curler, 2019 World champion.

== Teams ==
Season	Skip	Third	Second	Lead	Alternate	Coach	Events
2018–19	Wang Haitao	Zhang Mingliang	Xu Xinchen	Yan Zhou	Zhang Qiang	Li Jianrui	WWhCC 2019 (gold)
