= 2011 World Wheelchair Curling Championship – Qualification Event =

2011 World Wheelchair Curling Championship Qualification Event
- Host city: Lohja, Finland
- Arena: Kisakallio Sports Institute
- Dates: November 7–12, 2010
- Winner: China
- Skip: Wang Haitao
- Third: Liu Wei
- Second: Xu Guangqin
- Lead: He Jun
- Alternate: Zhang Qiang
- Coach: Li Hongchen
- Finalist: Russia (Marat Romanov)

The qualification event for the 2011 World Wheelchair Curling Championship took place from November 7 to 12, 2010 at the Kisakallio Sports Institute in Lohja, Finland. The event's two top finishers (China and Russia) both qualify to participate in the 2011 World Wheelchair Curling Championship.

The two qualification spots are determined as follows: At the conclusion of the round-robin, the top four teams advance to the playoffs. The playoffs follow the first and second rounds of the page playoff system. In the first round, the first seed plays the second and the third seed playing the fourth. In the final round, the loser of 1 v. 2 plays the winner of 3 vs. 4 in the Second Place Game, like in the semifinal of the page playoff system. However, unlike the page playoff system, the winner of 1 vs. 2. The winner of 1 vs. 2 qualifies to the worlds, while the winner of the second place game also qualifies to the worlds.

== Teams ==
| China | Denmark | Finland |
|---|---|---|
| Skip: Wang Haitao Third: Liu Wei; Second: Xu Guangqin; Lead: He Jun; Alternate: Zhang Qiang; Coach: Li Hongchen | Skip: Kenneth Ørbæk Third: Jørn Kristensen; Second: Rosita Jensen; Lead: Robert Fezerskov Hansen; Coach: Per Christensen | Skip: Vesa Hellman Third: Tuomo Aarnikka; Second: Markku Karjalainen; Lead: Riitta Särösalo; Alternate: Sari Karjalainen; Coach: Lauri Ikävalko |
| Italy | Japan | Latvia |
| Skip: Egidio Marchese Third: Gabriele Dallapiccola; Second: Angela Menardi; Lead: Emanuele Spelorzi; Alternate: Andrea Tabanelli | Skip: Katsuo Ichikawa Third: Kazuyuki Mochiki; Second: Aki Ogawa; Lead: Ayako Saitoh; Alternate: Yoji Nakajima; Coach: Teruo Moriizumi | Skip: Aleksandrs Dimbovkis Third: Ojars Briedis; Second: Ilmars Nicmanis; Lead: Vita Miezite; Alternate: Maris Dzelzkalns; Coach: Artis Zentelis |
| Russia | Slovakia | Switzerland |
| Skip: Marat Romanov Third: Andrey Smirnov; Second: Alexander Shevchenko; Lead: Svetlana Pakhomova; Alternate: Oleg Makarov; Coach: Vladimir Shevchenko | Skip: Radoslav Duris Third: Dusan Pitonak; Second: Branislav Jakubec; Lead: Alena Kánová; Alternate: Monika Kunkelova; Coach: Frantisek Pitonak | Fourth: Manfred Bolliger Third: Claudia Hüttenmoser; Second: Hieronymus Liechtenhan; Lead: Daniel Meyer; Alternate: Martin Bieri; Coach: Stephan Pfister |

== Round-robin standings ==
| Country | Skip | W | L |
| China | Wang Haitao | 7 | 1 |
| Italy | Egidio Marchese | 7 | 1 |
| Russia | Marat Romanov | 6 | 2 |
| Japan | Katsuo Ichikawa | 5 | 3 |
| Switzerland | Manfred Bolliger | 4 | 4 |
| Slovakia | Radoslav Duris | 3 | 5 |
| Denmark | Kenneth Ørbæk | 2 | 6 |
| Finland | Vesa Hellman | 2 | 6 |
| Latvia | Aleksandrs Dimbovkis | 0 | 8 |

== Round-robin results ==
=== Draw 1 ===
| Sheet A | 1 | 2 | 3 | 4 | 5 | 6 | 7 | 8 | Final |
| Russia (Romanov) | 1 | 0 | 3 | 3 | 0 | 0 | 3 | 0 | 10 |
| Italy (Marchese) | 0 | 3 | 0 | 0 | 3 | 3 | 0 | 2 | 11 |

| Sheet B | 1 | 2 | 3 | 4 | 5 | 6 | 7 | 8 | Final |
| China (Wang) | 1 | 2 | 2 | 0 | 1 | 0 | 1 | 0 | 7 |
| Japan (Ichikawa) | 0 | 0 | 0 | 3 | 0 | 1 | 0 | 2 | 6 |

| Sheet C | 1 | 2 | 3 | 4 | 5 | 6 | 7 | 8 | Final |
| Denmark (Ørbæk) | 0 | 0 | 3 | 0 | 0 | 1 | 1 | 1 | 6 |
| Switzerland (Bolliger) | 2 | 3 | 0 | 2 | 2 | 0 | 0 | 0 | 9 |

| Sheet D | 1 | 2 | 3 | 4 | 5 | 6 | 7 | 8 | Final |
| Slovakia (Duris) | 1 | 1 | 0 | 0 | 5 | 1 | 3 | X | 11 |
| Latvia (Dimbovkis) | 0 | 0 | 1 | 2 | 0 | 0 | 0 | X | 3 |

=== Draw 2 ===
| Sheet B | 1 | 2 | 3 | 4 | 5 | 6 | 7 | 8 | Final |
| Switzerland (Bolliger) | 2 | 0 | 3 | 0 | 3 | 0 | 0 | 1 | 9 |
| Finland (Hellman) 🔨 | 0 | 2 | 0 | 2 | 0 | 0 | 2 | 0 | 6 |

| Sheet C | 1 | 2 | 3 | 4 | 5 | 6 | 7 | 8 | EE | Final |
| Russia (Romanov) | 1 | 3 | 0 | 0 | 0 | 0 | 0 | 2 | 1 | 7 |
| Slovakia (Duris) 🔨 | 0 | 0 | 2 | 1 | 1 | 1 | 1 | 0 | 0 | 6 |

| Sheet D | 1 | 2 | 3 | 4 | 5 | 6 | 7 | 8 | Final |
| Denmark (Ørbæk) | 2 | 1 | 1 | 0 | 1 | 0 | 0 | 0 | 5 |
| Italy (Marchese) 🔨 | 0 | 0 | 0 | 1 | 0 | 2 | 2 | 1 | 6 |

| Sheet E | 1 | 2 | 3 | 4 | 5 | 6 | 7 | 8 | Final |
| Japan (Ichikawa) | 2 | 0 | 1 | 3 | 0 | 1 | 1 | 2 | 10 |
| Latvia (Dimbovkis) 🔨 | 0 | 1 | 0 | 0 | 2 | 0 | 0 | 0 | 3 |

=== Draw 3 ===
| Sheet A | 1 | 2 | 3 | 4 | 5 | 6 | 7 | 8 | Final |
| Latvia (Dimbovkis) | 3 | 1 | 1 | 0 | 0 | 0 | 0 | 0 | 5 |
| Finland (Hellman) 🔨 | 0 | 0 | 0 | 1 | 1 | 1 | 3 | 1 | 7 |

| Sheet B | 1 | 2 | 3 | 4 | 5 | 6 | 7 | 8 | Final |
| Italy (Marchese) | 0 | 0 | 3 | 1 | 2 | 1 | 0 | 1 | 8 |
| Slovakia (Duris) 🔨 | 2 | 1 | 0 | 0 | 0 | 0 | 2 | 0 | 5 |

| Sheet D | 1 | 2 | 3 | 4 | 5 | 6 | 7 | 8 | EE | Final |
| Switzerland (Bolliger) | 0 | 3 | 0 | 3 | 0 | 2 | 0 | 0 | 0 | 8 |
| Russia (Romanov) 🔨 | 2 | 0 | 2 | 0 | 1 | 0 | 2 | 1 | 1 | 9 |

| Sheet E | 1 | 2 | 3 | 4 | 5 | 6 | 7 | 8 | Final |
| Denmark (Ørbæk) | 0 | 0 | 1 | 0 | 1 | 0 | 0 | 0 | 2 |
| China (Wang) 🔨 | 1 | 1 | 0 | 3 | 0 | 3 | 1 | 1 | 10 |

=== Draw 4 ===
| Sheet A | 1 | 2 | 3 | 4 | 5 | 6 | 7 | 8 | Final |
| Italy (Marchese) | 1 | 0 | 0 | 1 | 1 | 0 | 1 | 2 | 6 |
| Japan (Ichikawa) 🔨 | 0 | 1 | 1 | 0 | 0 | 2 | 0 | 0 | 4 |

| Sheet B | 1 | 2 | 3 | 4 | 5 | 6 | 7 | 8 | Final |
| Denmark (Ørbæk) | 0 | 0 | 0 | 0 | 0 | 2 | 0 | X | 2 |
| Russia (Romanov) 🔨 | 1 | 4 | 2 | 1 | 1 | 0 | 2 | X | 11 |

| Sheet C | 1 | 2 | 3 | 4 | 5 | 6 | 7 | 8 | Final |
| China (Wang) | 1 | 2 | 0 | 2 | 1 | 0 | 3 | X | 9 |
| Finland (Hellman) 🔨 | 0 | 0 | 1 | 0 | 0 | 1 | 0 | X | 2 |

| Sheet E | 1 | 2 | 3 | 4 | 5 | 6 | 7 | 8 | Final |
| Slovakia (Duris) | 3 | 0 | 0 | 0 | 1 | 0 | 1 | 0 | 5 |
| Switzerland (Bolliger) 🔨 | 0 | 3 | 2 | 1 | 0 | 1 | 0 | 2 | 9 |

=== Draw 5 ===
| Sheet B | 1 | 2 | 3 | 4 | 5 | 6 | 7 | 8 | Final |
| Japan (Ichikawa) 🔨 | 0 | 2 | 2 | 1 | 0 | 0 | 1 | X | 6 |
| Switzerland (Bolliger) | 1 | 0 | 0 | 0 | 1 | 1 | 0 | X | 3 |

| Sheet C | 1 | 2 | 3 | 4 | 5 | 6 | 7 | 8 | Final |
| Italy (Marchese) 🔨 | 2 | 1 | 2 | 2 | 0 | 2 | 0 | X | 9 |
| Latvia (Dimbovkis) | 0 | 0 | 0 | 0 | 2 | 0 | 1 | X | 3 |

| Sheet D | 1 | 2 | 3 | 4 | 5 | 6 | 7 | 8 | Final |
| China (Wang) 🔨 | 1 | 0 | 1 | 0 | 0 | 2 | 3 | 3 | 10 |
| Slovakia (Duris) | 0 | 2 | 0 | 5 | 1 | 0 | 0 | 0 | 8 |

| Sheet E | 1 | 2 | 3 | 4 | 5 | 6 | 7 | 8 | Final |
| Finland (Hellman) | 0 | 1 | 0 | 2 | 0 | 0 | 4 | 0 | 7 |
| Russia (Romanov) 🔨 | 1 | 0 | 1 | 0 | 2 | 2 | 0 | 4 | 10 |

=== Draw 6 ===
| Sheet A | 1 | 2 | 3 | 4 | 5 | 6 | 7 | 8 | Final |
| Finland (Hellman) | 3 | 0 | 0 | 1 | 0 | 3 | 0 | 0 | 7 |
| Slovakia (Duris) 🔨 | 0 | 1 | 3 | 0 | 1 | 0 | 2 | 1 | 8 |

| Sheet B | 1 | 2 | 3 | 4 | 5 | 6 | 7 | 8 | Final |
| Russia (Romanov) 🔨 | 1 | 2 | 1 | 1 | 0 | 2 | 1 | 0 | 8 |
| Latvia (Dimbovkis) | 0 | 0 | 0 | 0 | 2 | 0 | 0 | 1 | 3 |

| Sheet C | 1 | 2 | 3 | 4 | 5 | 6 | 7 | 8 | Final |
| Switzerland (Bolliger) 🔨 | 2 | 0 | 1 | 0 | 1 | 1 | 0 | X | 5 |
| China (Wang) | 0 | 4 | 0 | 5 | 0 | 0 | 3 | X | 12 |

| Sheet D | 1 | 2 | 3 | 4 | 5 | 6 | 7 | 8 | Final |
| Japan (Ichikawa) 🔨 | 3 | 5 | 0 | 0 | 1 | 1 | 0 | 0 | 10 |
| Denmark (Ørbæk) | 0 | 0 | 1 | 2 | 0 | 0 | 2 | 2 | 7 |

=== Draw 7 ===
| Sheet A | 1 | 2 | 3 | 4 | 5 | 6 | 7 | 8 | Final |
| China (Wang) 🔨 | 1 | 1 | 0 | 1 | 0 | 0 | 1 | 0 | 4 |
| Russia (Romanov) | 0 | 0 | 2 | 0 | 2 | 0 | 0 | 1 | 5 |

| Sheet B | 1 | 2 | 3 | 4 | 5 | 6 | 7 | 8 | Final |
| Finland (Hellman) 🔨 | 0 | 0 | 1 | 0 | 0 | 0 | 0 | X | 1 |
| Italy (Marchese) | 1 | 1 | 0 | 2 | 1 | 2 | 4 | X | 11 |

| Sheet C | 1 | 2 | 3 | 4 | 5 | 6 | 7 | 8 | Final |
| Slovakia (Duris) | 1 | 1 | 0 | 0 | 2 | 0 | 1 | 0 | 5 |
| Japan (Ichikawa) 🔨 | 0 | 0 | 1 | 3 | 0 | 2 | 0 | 1 | 7 |

| Sheet E | 1 | 2 | 3 | 4 | 5 | 6 | 7 | 8 | EE | Final |
| Latvia (Dimbovkis) 🔨 | 1 | 0 | 3 | 1 | 0 | 0 | 1 | 0 | 0 | 6 |
| Denmark (Ørbæk) | 0 | 1 | 0 | 0 | 1 | 3 | 0 | 1 | 3 | 9 |

=== Draw 8 ===
| Sheet A | 1 | 2 | 3 | 4 | 5 | 6 | 7 | 8 | Final |
| Switzerland (Bolliger) 🔨 | 1 | 2 | 1 | 3 | 0 | 4 | 0 | X | 11 |
| Latvia (Dimbovkis) | 0 | 0 | 0 | 0 | 2 | 0 | 1 | X | 3 |

| Sheet C | 1 | 2 | 3 | 4 | 5 | 6 | 7 | 8 | Final |
| Finland (Hellman) 🔨 | 0 | 1 | 2 | 0 | 0 | 1 | 2 | 0 | 6 |
| Denmark (Ørbæk) | 3 | 0 | 0 | 1 | 2 | 0 | 0 | 3 | 9 |

| Sheet D | 1 | 2 | 3 | 4 | 5 | 6 | 7 | 8 | Final |
| Italy (Marchese) | 0 | 0 | 1 | 0 | 0 | 0 | 0 | X | 1 |
| China (Wang) 🔨 | 1 | 1 | 0 | 1 | 1 | 1 | 2 | X | 7 |

| Sheet E | 1 | 2 | 3 | 4 | 5 | 6 | 7 | 8 | Final |
| Russia (Romanov) | 1 | 0 | 3 | 0 | 0 | 4 | 0 | 0 | 8 |
| Japan (Ichikawa) 🔨 | 0 | 3 | 0 | 2 | 1 | 0 | 3 | 1 | 10 |

=== Draw 9 ===
| Sheet A | 1 | 2 | 3 | 4 | 5 | 6 | 7 | 8 | Final |
| Slovakia (Duris) 🔨 | 0 | 2 | 2 | 0 | 1 | 1 | 3 | 0 | 9 |
| Denmark (Ørbæk) | 2 | 0 | 0 | 1 | 0 | 0 | 0 | 1 | 4 |

| Sheet B | 1 | 2 | 3 | 4 | 5 | 6 | 7 | 8 | Final |
| Latvia (Dimbovkis) | 0 | 1 | 0 | 0 | 0 | 0 | 0 | X | 1 |
| China (Wang) 🔨 | 2 | 0 | 1 | 3 | 3 | 1 | 2 | X | 12 |

| Sheet D | 1 | 2 | 3 | 4 | 5 | 6 | 7 | 8 | Final |
| Finland (Hellman) 🔨 | 4 | 0 | 0 | 0 | 2 | 1 | 3 | X | 10 |
| Japan (Ichikawa) | 0 | 1 | 2 | 1 | 0 | 0 | 0 | X | 4 |

| Sheet E | 1 | 2 | 3 | 4 | 5 | 6 | 7 | 8 | Final |
| Switzerland (Bolliger) 🔨 | 1 | 0 | 0 | 1 | 0 | 0 | 0 | X | 2 |
| Italy (Marchese) | 0 | 1 | 1 | 0 | 1 | 3 | 1 | X | 7 |

== Playoffs ==
Second Place Game
2 | Italy | 4
4 | Russia Q | 6

Semifinals
1 | China Q | 10
2 | Italy | 4
3 | Japan | 6
4 | Russia | 9

=== 1 vs. 2 ===
| Sheet A | 1 | 2 | 3 | 4 | 5 | 6 | 7 | 8 | Final |
| China (Wang) | 0 | 7 | 0 | 1 | 1 | 0 | 1 | X | 10 |
| Italy (Marchese) | 1 | 0 | 1 | 0 | 0 | 2 | 0 | X | 4 |

China is qualified to participate in the worlds
Italy moves to Second Place Game

=== 3 vs. 4 ===
| Sheet B | 1 | 2 | 3 | 4 | 5 | 6 | 7 | 8 | Final |
| Japan (Ichikawa) | 1 | 0 | 0 | 0 | 1 | 0 | 4 | 0 | 6 |
| Russia (Romanov) | 0 | 1 | 1 | 4 | 0 | 2 | 0 | 1 | 9 |

Russia advances to Second Place Game

=== Second Place Game ===
Loser of 1 vs. 2 plays against Winner of 3 vs. 4 for the second qualification spot.

| Sheet B | 1 | 2 | 3 | 4 | 5 | 6 | 7 | 8 | EE | Final |
| Italy (Marchese) | 0 | 0 | 1 | 0 | 1 | 0 | 1 | 1 | 0 | 4 |
| Russia (Romanov) 🔨 | 1 | 1 | 0 | 2 | 0 | 0 | 0 | 0 | 2 | 6 |

Russia qualifies to participate in the worlds
