= 2013 World Wheelchair Curling Championship =

- Host city: Sochi, Russia
- Arena: Sochi Olympic Curling Centre
- Dates: February 16–23
- Winner: Canada
- Skip: Jim Armstrong
- Third: Dennis Thiessen
- Second: Ina Forrest
- Lead: Sonja Gaudet
- Alternate: Mark Ideson
- Coach: Joe Rea
- Finalist: Sweden (Jalle Jungnell)

The 2013 World Wheelchair Curling Championship was held from February 16 to 23 at the Sochi Olympic Curling Centre in Sochi, Russia. Canada won their third title after defeating Sweden in the final with a score of 4–3, becoming the first nation to win three world wheelchair curling titles.

== Qualification ==
- Russia (host country)
- Top seven teams from the 2012 World Wheelchair Curling Championship:
  - South Korea
  - China
  - Slovakia
  - United States
  - Canada
  - Scotland
  - Sweden
- Two teams from the 2013 WWhCC Qualification Event
  - Norway
  - Finland

=== Qualification event ===
Norway and Finland qualified from the qualifying event held in November 2012 in Lohja, Finland.

== Teams ==
The teams are listed as follows:

Canada	China	Finland	Norway	Russia
Skip: Jim Armstrong Third: Dennis Thiessen; Second: Ina Forrest; Lead: Sonja Gaudet; Alternate: Mark Ideson; Coach: Joe Rea	Skip: Wang Haitao Third: Liu Wei; Second: Xu Guangqin; Lead: He Jun; Alternate: Zhang Qiang; Coach: Li Jianrui	Fourth: Markku Karjalainen Skip: Vesa Hellman; Second: Sari Karjalainen; Lead: Tuomo Aarnikka; Alternate: Mina Mojtahedi; Coach: Osku Kuutamo	Skip: Rune Lorentsen Third: Jostein Stordahl; Second: Sissel Løchen; Lead: Terje Rafdal; Alternate: Ole Fredrik Syversen; Coach: Per Andreassen	Skip: Andrey Smirnov Third: Marat Romanov; Second: Alexander Shevchenko; Lead: Svetlana Pakhomova; Alternate: Oxana Slesarenko; Coach: Anton Batugin
Scotland	Slovakia	South Korea	Sweden	United States
Skip: Aileen Neilson Third: Gregor Ewan; Second: Bob McPherson; Lead: Tom Killin; Alternate: Angie Malone; Coach: Tony Zummack	Skip: Radoslav Ďuriš Third: Branislav Jakubec; Second: Dusan Pitoňák; Lead: Monika Kunkelová; Alternate: Alena Kánová; Coach: František Pitoňák	Skip: Kim Hak-sung Third: Jung Seung-won; Second: Noh Byeong-il; Lead: Kang Mi-suk; Alternate: Bang Min-ja; Coach: Park Kwon-il	Skip: Jalle Jungnell Third: Glenn Ikonen; Second: Patrik Kallin; Lead: Kristina Ulander; Alternate: Gert Erlandsson; Coach: Mats Mabergs	Skip: Patrick McDonald Third: David Palmer; Second: James Joseph; Lead: Penny Greely; Alternate: Meghan Lino; Coach: Steve Brown

== Round-robin standings ==
Final round-robin standings

Key
Teams to Playoffs
Teams to Tiebreakers

Country	Skip	W	L
Sweden	Jalle Jungnell	8	1
Canada	Jim Armstrong	8	1
United States	Patrick McDonald	7	2
China	Wang Haitao	4	5
Russia	Andrey Smirnov	4	5
Scotland	Aileen Neilson	4	5
Finland	Vesa Hellman	3	6
Slovakia	Radoslav Ďuriš	3	6
Norway	Rune Lorentsen	2	7
South Korea	Kim Hak-sung	2	7

== Round-robin results ==
All draw times are listed in Moscow Time (UTC+4).

=== Draw 1 ===
Saturday, February 16, 9:30

Sheet A	1	2	3	4	5	6	7	8	Final
Finland (Hellman) 🔨	0	0	0	4	0	0	0	X	4
Scotland (Neilson)	1	2	1	0	3	2	1	X	10

Sheet B	1	2	3	4	5	6	7	8	Final
South Korea (Kim) 🔨	0	0	0	1	0	0	0	X	1
Canada (Armstrong)	0	1	0	0	1	2	3	X	7

Sheet C	1	2	3	4	5	6	7	8	Final
China (Wang) 🔨	1	1	1	0	1	0	0	X	4
United States (McDonald)	0	0	0	3	0	2	2	X	7

Sheet D	1	2	3	4	5	6	7	8	Final
Sweden (Jungnell) 🔨	1	0	0	2	2	1	2	X	8
Russia (Smirnov)	0	1	0	0	0	0	0	X	1

=== Draw 2 ===
Saturday, February 16, 16:00

Sheet A	1	2	3	4	5	6	7	8	Final
Norway (Lorentsen) 🔨	1	1	0	2	2	1	0	X	7
Slovakia (Ďuriš)	0	0	1	0	0	0	0	X	1

Sheet B	1	2	3	4	5	6	7	8	Final
China (Wang) 🔨	0	1	0	2	0	0	1	0	4
Finland (Hellman)	1	0	1	0	2	2	0	2	8

Sheet C	1	2	3	4	5	6	7	8	Final
Russia (Smirnov)	1	3	0	2	1	1	0	X	8
South Korea (Kim) 🔨	0	0	3	0	0	0	1	X	4

Sheet D	1	2	3	4	5	6	7	8	Final
Canada (Armstrong) 🔨	0	2	0	1	1	4	0	X	8
Scotland (Neilson)	1	0	1	0	0	0	1	X	3

=== Draw 3 ===
Sunday, February 17, 9:30

Sheet A	1	2	3	4	5	6	7	8	Final
Russia (Smirnov) 🔨	1	0	1	0	2	0	1	0	5
Canada (Armstrong)	0	2	0	1	0	3	0	2	8

Sheet B	1	2	3	4	5	6	7	8	Final
Norway (Lorentsen) 🔨	0	1	0	0	0	1	X	X	2
United States (McDonald)	1	0	2	4	3	0	X	X	10

Sheet C	1	2	3	4	5	6	7	8	Final
Scotland (Neilson) 🔨	0	0	1	0	1	0	1	0	3
Sweden (Jungnell)	1	0	0	2	0	1	0	1	5

Sheet D	1	2	3	4	5	6	7	8	Final
Slovakia (Ďuriš) 🔨	1	1	0	1	0	5	1	X	9
Finland (Hellman)	0	0	1	0	2	0	0	X	3

=== Draw 4 ===
Sunday, February 17, 15:30

Draw 4 was postponed due to ice problems. The scheduled United States – South Korea game was moved to Draw 10, while the scheduled China – Norway and Slovakia – Sweden games were moved to Draw 11.

=== Draw 5 ===
Monday, February 18, 9:30

Sheet A	1	2	3	4	5	6	7	8	Final
Sweden (Jungnell) 🔨	1	0	0	1	1	0	0	1	4
United States (McDonald)	0	1	1	0	0	2	1	0	5

Sheet B	1	2	3	4	5	6	7	8	Final
South Korea (Kim) 🔨	1	0	2	0	0	0	2	0	5
Scotland (Neilson)	0	1	0	2	0	1	0	2	6

Sheet C	1	2	3	4	5	6	7	8	Final
Finland (Hellman) 🔨	0	0	0	0	2	0	1	X	3
Russia (Smirnov)	1	1	2	1	0	2	0	X	7

Sheet D	1	2	3	4	5	6	7	8	Final
China (Wang) 🔨	0	1	0	0	1	0	3	0	5
Canada (Armstrong)	3	0	0	3	0	2	0	1	9

=== Draw 6 ===
Monday, February 18, 15:30

Sheet A	1	2	3	4	5	6	7	8	Final
South Korea (Kim) 🔨	0	4	0	0	0	1	2	0	7
Finland (Hellman)	1	0	1	3	1	0	0	2	8

Sheet B	1	2	3	4	5	6	7	8	Final
Russia (Smirnov) 🔨	0	0	1	0	0	2	0	X	3
China (Wang)	1	0	0	1	2	0	1	X	5

Sheet C	1	2	3	4	5	6	7	8	Final
Slovakia (Ďuriš)	0	2	0	0	0	0	1	X	3
Canada (Armstrong) 🔨	3	0	0	2	1	1	0	X	7

Sheet D	1	2	3	4	5	6	7	8	Final
Scotland (Neilson) 🔨	0	1	1	0	0	1	2	X	5
Norway (Lorentsen)	0	0	0	1	1	0	0	X	2

=== Draw 7 ===
Tuesday, February 19, 9:30

Sheet B	1	2	3	4	5	6	7	8	Final
Canada (Armstrong) 🔨	1	1	1	1	0	2	1	X	7
United States (McDonald)	0	0	0	0	1	0	0	X	1

Sheet C	1	2	3	4	5	6	7	8	EE	Final
Norway (Lorentsen) 🔨	2	0	1	0	0	4	0	1	0	8
Sweden (Jungnell)	0	2	0	1	1	0	4	0	2	10

Sheet D	1	2	3	4	5	6	7	8	Final
Russia (Smirnov)	2	1	0	0	3	1	3	X	10
Slovakia (Ďuriš) 🔨	0	0	1	1	0	0	0	X	2

=== Draw 8 ===
Tuesday, February 19, 15:30

Sheet A	1	2	3	4	5	6	7	8	Final
Scotland (Neilson)	0	0	1	0	1	1	0	1	4
China (Wang) 🔨	1	2	0	1	0	0	2	0	6

Sheet B	1	2	3	4	5	6	7	8	Final
Finland (Hellman)	1	0	0	3	0	0	1	1	6
Norway (Lorentsen) 🔨	0	2	1	0	1	1	0	0	5

Sheet C	1	2	3	4	5	6	7	8	Final
United States (McDonald) 🔨	2	2	1	3	0	0	1	X	9
Slovakia (Ďuriš)	0	0	0	0	0	1	0	X	1

Sheet D	1	2	3	4	5	6	7	8	EE	Final
South Korea (Kim) 🔨	0	0	0	0	1	2	0	3	0	6
Sweden (Jungnell)	0	2	1	2	0	0	1	0	1	7

=== Draw 9 ===
Wednesday, February 20, 9:30

Sheet A	1	2	3	4	5	6	7	8	Final
Canada (Armstrong)	0	0	1	1	0	3	2	0	7
Sweden (Jungnell) 🔨	2	1	0	0	3	0	0	2	8

Sheet B	1	2	3	4	5	6	7	8	Final
China (Wang)	1	0	3	3	0	0	2	X	9
South Korea (Kim) 🔨	0	1	0	0	0	3	0	X	4

Sheet C	1	2	3	4	5	6	7	8	Final
Russia (Smirnov) 🔨	0	0	0	1	0	0	0	1	2
Scotland (Neilson)	0	0	0	0	1	0	0	0	1

Sheet D	1	2	3	4	5	6	7	8	EE	Final
Finland (Hellman) 🔨	1	2	1	0	1	1	1	0	0	7
United States (McDonald)	0	0	0	4	0	0	0	3	1	8

=== Draw 10 ===
Wednesday, February 20, 15:30

Sheet A	1	2	3	4	5	6	7	8	Final
Norway (Lorentsen) 🔨	4	0	0	2	2	1	0	X	9
Russia (Smirnov)	0	0	1	0	0	0	4	X	5

Sheet B	1	2	3	4	5	6	7	8	Final
Scotland (Neilson)	0	0	0	1	0	1	0	X	2
Slovakia (Duris) 🔨	1	1	1	0	1	0	1	X	5

Sheet C	1	2	3	4	5	6	7	8	Final
Canada (Armstrong) 🔨	0	3	2	1	0	1	1	X	8
Finland (Hellman)	1	0	0	0	1	0	0	X	2

Sheet D	1	2	3	4	5	6	7	8	Final
United States (McDonald)	1	0	2	2	0	0	2	X	7
South Korea (Kim) 🔨	0	1	0	0	1	1	0	X	3

=== Draw 11 ===
Wednesday, February 20, 19:30

Sheet A	1	2	3	4	5	6	7	8	Final
China (Wang) 🔨	2	0	2	0	2	0	1	X	7
Norway (Lorentsen)	0	1	0	1	0	2	0	X	4

Sheet B	1	2	3	4	5	6	7	8	Final
Slovakia (Duris) 🔨	0	1	0	0	0	0	1	X	2
Sweden (Jungnell)	1	0	2	3	1	1	0	X	8

=== Draw 12 ===
Thursday, February 21, 9:00

Sheet A	1	2	3	4	5	6	7	8	Final
Slovakia (Ďuriš) 🔨	0	0	1	0	0	0	X	X	1
South Korea (Kim)	3	1	0	2	1	2	X	X	9

Sheet B	1	2	3	4	5	6	7	8	EE	Final
United States (McDonald)	0	2	0	0	0	1	1	0	1	5
Russia (Smirnov) 🔨	1	0	2	0	0	0	0	1	0	4

Sheet C	1	2	3	4	5	6	7	8	Final
Sweden (Jungnell) 🔨	0	1	0	2	2	0	3	X	8
China (Wang)	0	0	1	0	0	2	0	X	3

Sheet D	1	2	3	4	5	6	7	8	Final
Norway (Lorentsen) 🔨	2	0	0	0	1	1	2	0	6
Canada (Armstrong)	0	2	3	1	0	0	0	1	7

=== Draw 13 ===
Thursday, February 21, 14:30

Sheet A	1	2	3	4	5	6	7	8	Final
United States (McDonald) 🔨	1	0	1	1	1	0	0	1	5
Scotland (Neilson)	0	3	0	0	0	2	2	0	7

Sheet B	1	2	3	4	5	6	7	8	Final
Sweden (Jungnell) 🔨	3	0	2	0	2	1	0	2	10
Finland (Hellman)	0	1	0	3	0	0	4	0	8

Sheet C	1	2	3	4	5	6	7	8	Final
South Korea (Kim) 🔨	1	3	0	0	4	0	0	X	8
Norway (Lorentsen)	0	0	1	0	0	1	1	X	3

Sheet D	1	2	3	4	5	6	7	8	Final
Slovakia (Ďuriš) 🔨	1	0	2	0	3	0	0	2	8
China (Wang)	0	1	0	2	0	2	0	0	5

== Placement Game ==
Thursday, February 21, 20:00

Sheet A	1	2	3	4	5	6	7	8	Final
Slovakia (Ďuriš) 🔨	1	1	0	0	3	1	0	2	8
Finland (Hellman)	0	0	1	1	0	0	2	0	4

== Tiebreakers ==
Thursday, February 21, 20:00

Sheet C	1	2	3	4	5	6	7	8	Final
Russia (Smirnov) 🔨	0	1	0	1	2	0	3	0	7
Scotland (Neilson)	1	0	1	0	0	1	0	2	5

Friday, February 22, 9:00

Sheet A	1	2	3	4	5	6	7	8	Final
China (Wang)	1	2	1	0	4	0	0	X	8
Russia (Smirnov) 🔨	0	0	0	2	0	1	0	X	3

== Playoffs ==
Page playoff system
1	Sweden	6
2	Canada	5
3	United States	8
4	China	4

Semifinal
2	Canada	6
3	United States	3

Gold Medal Game
1	Sweden	3
2	Canada	4

Bronze Medal Game
3	United States	5
4	China	6

=== 1 vs. 2 ===
Friday, February 22, 14:30

Sheet A	1	2	3	4	5	6	7	8	Final
Sweden (Jungnell) 🔨	1	0	0	2	0	2	0	1	6
Canada (Armstrong)	0	2	0	0	1	0	2	0	5

=== 3 vs. 4 ===
Friday, February 22, 14:30

Sheet D	1	2	3	4	5	6	7	8	Final
United States (McDonald) 🔨	0	0	3	1	2	2	0	X	8
China (Wang)	2	1	0	0	0	0	1	X	4

=== Semifinal ===
Friday, February 22, 20:00

Sheet B	1	2	3	4	5	6	7	8	Final
Canada (Armstrong)	1	0	2	0	2	1	0	X	6
United States (McDonald) 🔨	0	1	0	1	0	0	1	X	3

=== Bronze medal game ===
Saturday, February 23, 9:30

Sheet C	1	2	3	4	5	6	7	8	Final
United States (McDonald) 🔨	2	0	1	0	1	0	1	0	5
China (Wang)	0	1	0	1	0	2	0	2	6

=== Gold medal game ===
Saturday, February 23, 15:30

Sheet C	1	2	3	4	5	6	7	8	Final
Sweden (Jungnell) 🔨	0	1	0	1	0	1	0	0	3
Canada (Armstrong)	1	0	1	0	1	0	0	1	4

2013 World Wheelchair Curling Championship
(Canada)
Canada
3rd title
