= Yan Zhuo =

Chinese female wheelchair curler

- Curler ♀
- Born: 7 April 1992 (age 34); Beijing, China

Curling career
- Member Association: China
- World Wheelchair Championship: 3 (2019, 2021, 2024)
- Paralympic: 1 (2022)
Medal record
Wheelchair curling
Representing China
Winter Paralympics
Gold medal – first place	2022 Beijing	Mixed team
World Wheelchair Championship
Gold medal – first place	2019 Stirling	Mixed Team
Gold medal – first place	2021 Beijing	Mixed Team
Bronze medal – third place	2024 Gangneung	Mixed Team

Yan Zhuo ( Chinese: 闫卓)(born 7 April 1992) is a Chinese wheelchair curler, 2022 Paralympics champion, 2019 and 2021 World Champion.

== Teams ==
Season	Skip	Third	Second	Lead	Alternate	Coach	Events
2018–19	Wang Haitao	Zhang Mingliang	Xu Xinchen	Yan Zhuo	Zhang Qiang	Li Jianrui	WWhCC 2019 (gold)
2021–22	Wang Haitao	Chen Jianxin	Zhang Mingliang	Yan Zhuo	Sun Yulong	Yue Qingshuang	WWhCC 2021 (gold); WPG 2022 (gold)
