= David Palmer (curler) =

American wheelchair curler and Paralympian

- Curler ♂
- Born: November 2, 1960 (age 66); Marlborough, Massachusetts, U.S.

Team
- Curling club: Cape Cod CC, Falmouth, Massachusetts

Curling career
- Member Association: United States
- World Wheelchair Championship: 2 (2012, 2013)
- Paralympic: 1 (2014)
Medal record
Wheelchair curling

David "Dave" Palmer (born November 2, 1960 in Marlborough, Massachusetts) is an American wheelchair curler.

He participated in the 2014 Winter Paralympics where American team finished on fifth place.

== Teams ==
Season	Skip	Third	Second	Lead	Alternate	Coach	Events
2011–12	Patrick McDonald	David Palmer	James Joseph	Penny Greely	Timothy Kelly	Steve Brown	WWhCC 2012 (5th)
2012–13	Patrick McDonald	David Palmer	James Joseph	Penny Greely	Meghan Lino	Steve Brown	WWhCC 2013 (4th)
2013–14	Patrick McDonald	David Palmer	Jimmy Joseph	Penny Greely	Meghan Lino	Steve Brown	WPG 2014 (5th)
