= 2019 World Wheelchair Curling Championship =

- Host city: Stirling, Scotland
- Arena: The Peak
- Dates: March 3–10
- Winner: China
- Skip: Wang Haitao
- Third: Zhang Mingliang
- Second: Xu Xinchen
- Lead: Yan Zhou
- Alternate: Zhang Qiang
- Coach: Li Jianrui
- Finalist: Scotland (Aileen Neilson)

The 2019 World Wheelchair Curling Championship was held from March 3 to 10 at The Peak in Stirling, Scotland.

== Qualification ==
The following nations qualified to participate in the 2019 World Wheelchair Curling Championship:

- Scotland (host country)
- Top eight teams from the 2017 World Wheelchair Curling Championship
  - Norway
  - Russia
  - China
  - Canada
  - South Korea
  - United States
  - Switzerland
  - Germany
- Top three teams from the 2018 World Wheelchair-B Curling Championship
  - Estonia
  - Slovakia
  - Latvia
1. Because Scotland, one of the top eight teams in the 2017 World Championship, already qualified as the host country, Germany who ranked 9th in the competition additionally qualified.

== Teams ==
The teams are listed as follows:

Canada	China	Estonia	Germany
Skip: Mark Ideson; Third: Collinda Joseph; Second: Jon Thurston; Lead: Marie Wright; Alternate: Ina Forrest; Coach: Wayne Kiel	Skip: Wang Haitao; Third: Zhang Mingliang; Second: Xu Xinchen; Lead: Yan Zhou; Alternate: Zhang Qiang; Coach: Li Jianrui	Skip: Viljar Villiste; Third: Andrei Koitmae; Second: Ain Villau; Lead: Signe Falkenberg; Alternate: Lauri Murasov; Coach: Erkki Lill, Sulev Lokk	Skip: Christiane Putzich; Third: Harry Pavel; Second: Wolf Meissner; Lead: Heike Melchior; Alternate: Melanie Kurth; Coach: Helmar Erlewein, Jamie Boutin
Latvia	Norway	Russia	Scotland
Skip: Poļina Rožkova; Third: Sergejs Djačenko; Second: Agris Lasmans; Lead: Ojārs Briedis; Coach: Arnis Veidemanis, Signe Rinkule	Skip: Rune Lorentsen; Third: Jostein Stordahl; Second: Ole Fredrik Syversen; Lead: Sissel Løchen; Alternate: Rikke Iversen; Coach: Peter Dahlman	Skip: Andrey Smirnov; Third: Marat Romanov; Second: Alexander Shevchenko; Lead: Daria Shchukina; Alternate: Andrei Meshcheriakov; Coach: Anton Batugin, Margarita Nesterova	Fourth: Hugh Nibloe; Skip: Aileen Neilson; Second: David Melrose; Lead: Robert McPherson; Alternate: Gary Logan; Coach: Sheila Swan
Slovakia	South Korea	Switzerland	United States
Skip: Radoslav Ďuriš; Third: Dušan Pitoňák; Second: Imrich Lyócsa; Lead: Monika Kunkelová; Alternate: Peter Zaťko; Coach: Frantisek Pitonak, Milan Bubenik	Fourth: Yang Hui-tae; Third: Seo Soon-seok; Skip: Cha Jin-ho; Lead: Bang Min-ja; Alternate: Min Byeong-seok; Coach: Beak Jong-chul, Kim Seok-hyun	Skip: Raymond Pfyffer; Third: Hans Burgener; Second: Eric Decorvet; Lead: Françoise Jaquerod; Alternate: Adelah Al Roumi; Coach: Stephan Pfister, Anne Gabriele Mittaz	Skip: Steve Emt; Third: Matt Thums; Second: David Samsa; Lead: Pam Wilson; Alternate: Meghan Lino; Coach: Rusty Schieber, Ann Swisshelm

== Round-robin standings ==
Final round-robin standings

Key
Teams to playoffs
Teams relegated to 2019 B Championship

Country	Skip	W	L
China	Wang Haitao	8	3
Norway	Rune Lorentsen	8	3
Scotland	Aileen Neilson	7	4
Switzerland	Raymond Pfyffer	6	5
South Korea	Cha Jin-ho	6	5
Slovakia	Radoslav Ďuriš	6	5
Russia	Andrey Smirnov	5	6
Estonia	Viljar Villiste	5	6
Latvia	Poļina Rožkova	5	6
Canada	Mark Ideson	5	6
United States	Steve Emt	4	7
Germany	Christiane Putzich	1	10

== Round-robin results ==
All draw times are listed in Greenwich Mean Time (UTC±0).

=== Draw 1 ===
Sunday, March 3, 14:00

Sheet A	1	2	3	4	5	6	7	8	Final
Estonia (Villiste) 🔨	2	0	0	0	1	1	0	2	6
United States (Emt)	0	1	3	1	0	0	2	0	7

Sheet B	1	2	3	4	5	6	7	8	Final
Germany (Putzich)	0	0	1	0	0	1	1	X	3
Russia (Smirnov) 🔨	0	3	0	0	4	0	0	X	7

Sheet C	1	2	3	4	5	6	7	8	Final
Canada (Ideson) 🔨	0	1	0	0	0	4	1	0	6
Latvia (Rožkova)	3	0	0	1	1	0	0	2	7

Sheet D	1	2	3	4	5	6	7	8	Final
South Korea (Cha)	0	0	0	1	0	0	1	X	2
China (Wang) 🔨	2	1	1	0	0	1	0	X	5

=== Draw 2 ===
Sunday, March 3, 19:00

Sheet A	1	2	3	4	5	6	7	8	Final
Norway (Lorentsen) 🔨	0	2	1	0	2	0	3	X	8
Slovakia (Ďuriš)	0	0	0	3	0	1	0	X	4

Sheet B	1	2	3	4	5	6	7	8	Final
Latvia (Rožkova)	0	0	2	0	1	0	1	0	4
China (Wang) 🔨	0	2	0	1	0	1	0	3	7

Sheet C	1	2	3	4	5	6	7	8	Final
Scotland (Neilson)	0	0	0	2	0	2	0	0	4
Switzerland (Pfyffer) 🔨	0	2	1	0	1	0	0	1	5

Sheet D	1	2	3	4	5	6	7	8	Final
Russia (Smirnov)	2	1	2	0	4	2	X	X	11
Estonia (Villiste) 🔨	0	0	0	1	0	0	X	X	1

=== Draw 3 ===
Monday, March 4, 9:00

Sheet B	1	2	3	4	5	6	7	8	Final
Canada (Ideson) 🔨	2	0	0	0	1	0	1	0	4
South Korea (Cha)	0	1	1	1	0	1	0	1	5

Sheet C	1	2	3	4	5	6	7	8	Final
Germany (Putzich) 🔨	0	0	1	1	0	0	1	X	3
United States (Emt)	3	3	0	0	1	1	0	X	8

=== Draw 4 ===
Monday, March 4, 14:00

Sheet A	1	2	3	4	5	6	7	8	Final
China (Wang)	0	1	0	1	0	1	0	X	3
Switzerland (Pfyffer) 🔨	1	0	0	0	0	0	1	X	2

Sheet B	1	2	3	4	5	6	7	8	EE	Final
Estonia (Villiste)	0	0	3	1	0	2	0	0	0	6
Slovakia (Ďuriš) 🔨	1	1	0	0	1	0	2	1	1	7

Sheet C	1	2	3	4	5	6	7	8	Final
Russia (Smirnov)	0	1	0	1	0	0	0	X	2
Norway (Lorentsen) 🔨	3	0	2	0	0	1	1	X	7

Sheet D	1	2	3	4	5	6	7	8	Final
Scotland (Neilson) 🔨	2	0	0	0	0	2	2	1	7
Latvia (Rožkova)	0	2	3	2	1	0	0	0	8

=== Draw 5 ===
Monday, March 4, 19:00

Sheet A	1	2	3	4	5	6	7	8	EE	Final
Scotland (Neilson) 🔨	0	1	0	0	3	0	3	0	2	9
Germany (Putzich)	0	0	1	2	0	1	0	3	0	7

Sheet B	1	2	3	4	5	6	7	8	Final
United States (Emt)	0	0	2	0	1	0	0	0	3
Switzerland (Pfyffer) 🔨	1	1	0	1	0	2	1	1	7

Sheet C	1	2	3	4	5	6	7	8	EE	Final
Slovakia (Ďuriš) 🔨	1	0	2	0	0	2	0	2	0	7
South Korea (Cha)	0	2	0	2	1	0	2	0	1	8

Sheet D	1	2	3	4	5	6	7	8	Final
Canada (Ideson)	0	2	0	0	0	0	X	X	2
Norway (Lorentsen) 🔨	3	0	1	2	2	1	X	X	9

=== Draw 6 ===
Tuesday, March 5, 9:00

Sheet A	1	2	3	4	5	6	7	8	Final
Latvia (Rožkova) 🔨	1	0	2	0	0	1	0	X	4
Russia (Smirnov)	0	5	0	1	0	0	1	X	7

Sheet B	1	2	3	4	5	6	7	8	Final
Norway (Lorentsen) 🔨	2	0	0	1	0	1	0	0	4
Scotland (Neilson)	0	1	1	0	2	0	1	2	7

Sheet C	1	2	3	4	5	6	7	8	Final
Estonia (Villiste)	0	2	0	1	0	1	0	3	7
China (Wang) 🔨	1	0	1	0	2	0	2	0	6

Sheet D	1	2	3	4	5	6	7	8	EE	Final
Switzerland (Pfyffer) 🔨	1	0	0	2	1	1	0	0	1	6
Slovakia (Ďuriš)	0	1	0	0	0	0	1	3	0	5

=== Draw 7 ===
Tuesday, March 5, 14:00

Sheet A	1	2	3	4	5	6	7	8	Final
South Korea (Cha) 🔨	1	0	0	0	1	3	1	0	6
Scotland (Neilson)	0	2	3	1	0	0	0	1	7

Sheet B	1	2	3	4	5	6	7	8	Final
Slovakia (Ďuriš)	2	0	2	0	0	2	3	X	9
Germany (Putzich) 🔨	0	1	0	1	1	0	0	X	7

Sheet C	1	2	3	4	5	6	7	8	Final
Switzerland (Pfyffer) 🔨	0	2	2	0	1	0	2	1	8
Canada (Ideson)	0	0	0	2	0	2	0	0	4

Sheet D	1	2	3	4	5	6	7	8	Final
Norway (Lorentsen) 🔨	1	0	2	2	1	0	0	2	8
United States (Emt)	0	1	0	0	0	2	2	0	5

=== Draw 8 ===
Tuesday, March 5, 19:00

Sheet A	1	2	3	4	5	6	7	8	Final
Germany (Putzich)	0	0	0	2	0	2	1	1	6
Estonia (Villiste) 🔨	0	3	1	0	3	0	0	0	7

Sheet B	1	2	3	4	5	6	7	8	Final
China (Wang)	0	1	0	1	0	0	1	0	3
Canada (Ideson) 🔨	1	0	2	0	0	1	0	1	5

Sheet C	1	2	3	4	5	6	7	8	Final
United States (Emt) 🔨	2	0	0	0	2	3	0	0	7
Russia (Smirnov)	0	0	0	2	0	0	2	1	5

Sheet D	1	2	3	4	5	6	7	8	Final
Latvia (Rožkova) 🔨	1	0	1	1	0	0	3	1	7
South Korea (Cha)	0	1	0	0	1	4	0	0	6

=== Draw 9 ===
Wednesday, March 6, 9:00

Sheet A	1	2	3	4	5	6	7	8	Final
Switzerland (Pfyffer) 🔨	1	0	2	0	0	0	0	X	3
Latvia (Rožkova)	0	2	0	2	1	1	1	X	7

Sheet B	1	2	3	4	5	6	7	8	Final
Estonia (Villiste) 🔨	0	1	0	1	0	0	0	X	2
Norway (Lorentsen)	0	0	2	0	1	1	2	X	6

Sheet C	1	2	3	4	5	6	7	8	Final
China (Wang)	1	2	2	0	0	0	2	X	7
Scotland (Neilson) 🔨	0	0	0	2	1	0	0	X	3

Sheet D	1	2	3	4	5	6	7	8	Final
Slovakia (Ďuriš)	1	0	0	1	2	0	0	X	4
Russia (Smirnov) 🔨	0	1	1	0	0	5	1	X	8

=== Draw 10 ===
Wednesday, March 6, 14:00

Sheet A	1	2	3	4	5	6	7	8	Final
Canada (Ideson) 🔨	3	0	1	0	1	0	1	2	8
Slovakia (Ďuriš)	0	3	0	2	0	2	0	0	7

Sheet B	1	2	3	4	5	6	7	8	Final
United States (Emt) 🔨	0	1	0	2	1	1	1	0	6
Scotland (Neilson)	2	0	2	0	0	0	0	3	7

Sheet C	1	2	3	4	5	6	7	8	Final
Norway (Lorentsen)	0	0	0	1	0	1	0	X	2
South Korea (Cha) 🔨	0	2	1	0	1	0	2	X	6

Sheet D	1	2	3	4	5	6	7	8	Final
Switzerland (Pfyffer) 🔨	0	1	0	1	0	0	0	X	2
Germany (Putzich)	0	0	2	0	2	2	1	X	7

=== Draw 11 ===
Wednesday, March 6, 19:00

Sheet A	1	2	3	4	5	6	7	8	Final
China (Wang)	3	0	2	0	2	0	2	X	9
United States (Emt) 🔨	0	2	0	1	0	2	0	X	5

Sheet B	1	2	3	4	5	6	7	8	Final
Russia (Smirnov)	0	1	0	0	1	0	1	X	3
Canada (Ideson) 🔨	2	0	1	1	0	2	0	X	6

Sheet C	1	2	3	4	5	6	7	8	Final
Germany (Putzich) 🔨	0	1	0	0	1	0	0	X	2
Latvia (Rožkova)	1	0	2	1	0	4	1	X	9

Sheet D	1	2	3	4	5	6	7	8	Final
South Korea (Cha) 🔨	1	1	0	1	0	1	0	X	4
Estonia (Villiste)	0	0	1	0	3	0	2	X	6

=== Draw 12 ===
Tuesday, March 7, 9:00

Sheet A	1	2	3	4	5	6	7	8	Final
Switzerland (Pfyffer) 🔨	0	0	0	0	0	1	X	X	1
Norway (Lorentsen)	5	2	1	1	1	0	X	X	10

Sheet B	1	2	3	4	5	6	7	8	EE	Final
South Korea (Cha) 🔨	1	0	1	0	2	0	2	0	1	7
United States (Emt)	0	1	0	1	0	1	0	3	0	6

Sheet C	1	2	3	4	5	6	7	8	Final
Scotland (Neilson)	0	0	0	2	2	0	1	0	5
Slovakia (Ďuriš) 🔨	1	4	1	0	0	1	0	2	9

Sheet D	1	2	3	4	5	6	7	8	Final
Germany (Putzich) 🔨	0	0	1	0	1	0	0	X	2
Canada (Ideson)	1	2	0	3	0	0	1	X	7

=== Draw 13 ===
Thursday, March 7, 14:00

Sheet A	1	2	3	4	5	6	7	8	Final
United States (Emt) 🔨	0	1	0	0	1	0	1	X	3
Canada (Ideson)	0	0	2	2	0	3	0	X	7

Sheet B	1	2	3	4	5	6	7	8	Final
Latvia (Rožkova)	0	0	1	0	2	0	X	X	3
Estonia (Villiste) 🔨	1	4	0	1	0	5	X	X	11

Sheet C	1	2	3	4	5	6	7	8	EE	Final
South Korea (Cha) 🔨	0	3	0	0	0	1	1	0	3	8
Germany (Putzich)	2	0	1	0	1	0	0	1	0	5

Sheet D	1	2	3	4	5	6	7	8	EE	Final
Russia (Smirnov)	0	1	0	1	0	0	0	1	0	3
China (Wang) 🔨	1	0	1	0	0	1	0	0	1	4

=== Draw 14 ===
Thursday, March 7, 19:00

Sheet A	1	2	3	4	5	6	7	8	Final
Slovakia (Ďuriš) 🔨	1	2	0	0	2	0	1	1	7
China (Wang)	0	0	2	1	0	2	0	0	5

Sheet B	1	2	3	4	5	6	7	8	Final
Scotland (Neilson) 🔨	0	1	0	1	0	1	1	1	5
Russia (Smirnov)	1	0	2	0	1	0	0	0	4

Sheet C	1	2	3	4	5	6	7	8	Final
Latvia (Rožkova)	0	0	1	0	0	0	X	X	1
Norway (Lorentsen) 🔨	4	1	0	2	1	0	X	X	8

Sheet D	1	2	3	4	5	6	7	8	Final
Estonia (Villiste) 🔨	2	0	0	1	0	0	2	0	5
Switzerland (Pfyffer)	0	1	2	0	1	1	0	1	6

=== Draw 15 ===
Friday, March 8, 9:00

Sheet A	1	2	3	4	5	6	7	8	Final
Russia (Smirnov)	0	0	0	1	0	0	0	X	1
South Korea (Cha) 🔨	1	0	1	0	1	2	2	X	7

Sheet B	1	2	3	4	5	6	7	8	Final
Germany (Putzich) 🔨	0	1	0	2	0	1	0	2	6
China (Wang)	3	0	2	0	2	0	1	0	8

Sheet C	1	2	3	4	5	6	7	8	Final
Canada (Ideson) 🔨	2	0	0	0	0	2	0	X	4
Estonia (Villiste)	0	2	1	1	2	0	2	X	8

Sheet D	1	2	3	4	5	6	7	8	Final
United States (Emt) 🔨	1	0	0	1	4	0	1	1	8
Latvia (Rožkova)	0	2	1	0	0	2	0	0	5

=== Draw 16 ===
Friday, March 8, 14:00

Sheet A	1	2	3	4	5	6	7	8	Final
Estonia (Villiste) 🔨	0	2	0	0	1	0	X	X	3
Scotland (Neilson)	0	0	4	2	0	3	X	X	9

Sheet B	1	2	3	4	5	6	7	8	Final
Slovakia (Ďuriš) 🔨	3	0	2	2	0	1	0	0	8
Latvia (Rožkova)	0	3	0	0	3	0	0	1	7

Sheet C	1	2	3	4	5	6	7	8	Final
Russia (Smirnov) 🔨	0	0	1	0	1	2	3	X	7
Switzerland (Pfyffer)	0	0	0	2	0	0	0	X	2

Sheet D	1	2	3	4	5	6	7	8	Final
China (Wang)	0	0	1	0	1	0	1	1	4
Norway (Lorentsen) 🔨	0	1	0	1	0	0	0	0	2

=== Draw 17 ===
Friday, March 8, 19:00

Sheet A	1	2	3	4	5	6	7	8	Final
Norway (Lorentsen) 🔨	1	0	1	1	3	0	0	1	7
Germany (Putzich)	0	1	0	0	0	2	1	0	4

Sheet B	1	2	3	4	5	6	7	8	Final
Switzerland (Pfyffer) 🔨	2	0	0	0	0	2	0	1	5
South Korea (Cha)	0	0	3	0	0	0	1	0	4

Sheet C	1	2	3	4	5	6	7	8	Final
Slovakia (Ďuriš)	0	1	0	1	0	2	3	1	8
United States (Emt) 🔨	2	0	2	0	3	0	0	0	7

Sheet D	1	2	3	4	5	6	7	8	Final
Canada (Ideson) 🔨	0	0	2	0	1	0	0	0	3
Scotland (Neilson)	1	1	0	1	0	1	0	1	5

== Playoffs ==
Qualification games
4	Switzerland	2
5	South Korea	10
3	Scotland	7
6	Slovakia	6

Semifinals
1	China	5
5	South Korea	2
2	Norway	3
3	Scotland	7

Final
1	China	5
3	Scotland	2

Bronze medal game
5	South Korea	10
2	Norway	3

=== Qualification games ===
Saturday, March 9, 13:00

Sheet D	1	2	3	4	5	6	7	8	Final
Switzerland (Pfyffer) 🔨	0	1	0	1	0	0	X	X	2
South Korea (Cha)	1	0	3	0	4	2	X	X	10

Sheet B	1	2	3	4	5	6	7	8	EE	Final
Scotland (Neilson) 🔨	1	0	1	1	1	2	0	0	1	7
Slovakia (Ďuriš)	0	2	0	0	0	0	3	1	0	6

=== Semi-finals ===
Saturday, March 9, 19:00

Sheet B	1	2	3	4	5	6	7	8	Final
China (Wang) 🔨	1	0	1	0	0	2	1	X	5
South Korea (Cha)	0	1	0	0	1	0	0	X	2

Sheet D	1	2	3	4	5	6	7	8	Final
Norway (Lorentsen) 🔨	1	0	0	1	0	1	0	0	3
Scotland (Neilson)	0	2	2	0	1	0	1	1	7

=== Bronze medal game ===
Sunday, March 10, 10:00

Sheet C	1	2	3	4	5	6	7	8	Final
South Korea (Cha)	0	4	2	0	0	3	1	X	10
Norway (Lorentsen) 🔨	1	0	0	1	1	0	0	X	3

=== Final ===
Sunday, March 10, 14:30

Sheet C	1	2	3	4	5	6	7	8	Final
China (Wang) 🔨	0	1	1	0	1	0	2	X	5
Scotland (Neilson)	0	0	0	1	0	1	0	X	2

== See also ==
- 2019 World Wheelchair-B Curling Championship
