= Branislav Jakubec =

Slovak wheelchair curler

- Curler ♂
- Born: 6 November 1967 (age 59); Myjava District

Team
- Curling club: Wheelchair Curling Club, Dubnica nad Váhom

Curling career
- Member Association: Slovakia
- World Wheelchair Championship: 3 (2012, 2013, 2015)
- Paralympic: 1 (2014)
Medal record
Wheelchair curling

Branislav Jakubec (born 6 November 1967 in Myjava District) is a Slovak wheelchair curler.

He participated at the 2014 Winter Paralympics where Slovak team finished on sixth place.

== Wheelchair curling teams and events ==
Season	Skip	Third	Second	Lead	Alternate	Coach	Events
2008–09	Radoslav Ďuriš	Dušan Pitoňák	Branislav Jakubec	Alena Kánová	Imrich Lyócsa	Pavol Pitoňák	WWhCQ 2008 (10th)
2010–11	Radoslav Ďuriš	Dušan Pitoňák	Branislav Jakubec	Alena Kánová	Monika Kunkelová	František Pitoňák	WWhCQ 2010 (6th)
2011–12	Radoslav Ďuriš	Branislav Jakubec	Dušan Pitoňák	Monika Kunkelová	Alena Kánová (WWhCC)	František Pitoňák	WWhCQ 2011 (gold); WWhCC 2012 (4th)
2012–13	Radoslav Ďuriš	Branislav Jakubec	Dušan Pitoňák	Monika Kunkelová	Alena Kánová	František Pitoňák	WWhCC 2013 (7th)
2013–14	Radoslav Ďuriš	Branislav Jakubec	Dušan Pitoňák	Monika Kunkelová	Alena Kánová	František Pitoňák	WPG 2014 (6th)
2014–15	Radoslav Ďuriš	Branislav Jakubec	Dušan Pitoňák	Monika Kunkelová	Imrich Lyócsa	František Pitoňák	WWhCC 2015 (4th)
