= Terje Rafdal =

Norwegian wheelchair curler (1965–2023)

- Curler ♂
- Born: 25 March 1965; Hønefoss, Norway
- Died: 9 May 2023 (aged 58); Oslo, Norway

Team
- Curling club: Snarøen CC, Oslo

Curling career
- Member Association: Norway
- World Wheelchair Championship: 3 (2011, 2012, 2013)
- Paralympic: 1 (2014)
Medal record
Wheelchair curling
World Wheelchair Championship
Bronze medal – third place	2011 Prague

Terje Rafdal (25 March 1965 – 9 May 2023) was a Norwegian wheelchair curler.

Rafdal participated at the 2014 Winter Paralympics where the Norwegian team finished in eighth place.

Rafdal died in Oslo on 9 May 2023, at the age of 58.

== Wheelchair curling teams and events ==
Season	Skip	Third	Second	Lead	Alternate	Coach	Events
2010–11	Rune Lorentsen	Jostein Stordahl	Tone Edvardsen	Terje Rafdal	Runar Bjørnstad	Thoralf Hognestad	WWhCC 2011 (bronze)
2011–12	Rune Lorentsen	Jostein Stordahl	Terje Rafdal	Sissel Løchen	Per Fagerhøi	Thoralf Hognestad	WWhCC 2012 (9th)
2012–13	Rune Lorentsen	Jostein Stordahl	Sissel Løchen	Terje Rafdal	Per Fagerhøi	Per Andreassen	WWhCQ 2012 (gold)
2012–13	Rune Lorentsen	Jostein Stordahl	Sissel Løchen	Terje Rafdal	Ole Fredrik Syversen	Per Andreassen	WWhCC 2013 (10th)
2013–14	Rune Lorentsen	Jostein Stordahl	Anne Mette Samdal	Terje Rafdal	Sissel Løchen	Ole Ingvaldsen	WPG 2014 (8th)
2014–15	Rune Lorentsen	Jostein Stordahl	Sissel Løchen	Terje Rafdal	Ole Fredrik Syversen	Per Andreassen	WWhCQ 2014 (gold)
