= Tony Zummack =

Scottish curler and coach

- Curler ♂
- Born: 30 November 1967 (age 58)

Curling career
- Member Association: Scotland, United Kingdom
Medal record
Curling

Tony Zummack (born 30 November 1967) is a Scottish and British curler and curling coach.

== Record as a coach of national teams ==
Year	Tournament, event	National team	Place
2012	2012 World Wheelchair Curling Championship	Scotland (wheelchair)	8
2013	2013 World Wheelchair Curling Championship	Scotland (wheelchair)	6
2014	2014 Winter Paralympics	United Kingdom (wheelchair)	3rd place, bronze medalist(s)
2015	2015 World Wheelchair Curling Championship	Scotland (wheelchair)	8
2015	2015 World Mixed Doubles Curling Championship	Scotland (mixed double)	19
2019	2019 World Mixed Curling Championship	Turkey (mixed)	9
2019	2019 European Curling Championships	Turkey (men)	14
2019	2019 European Curling Championships	Turkey (women)	12
2019	2019 World Mixed Doubles Qualification Event	Turkey (mixed double)	5
2019	2019 World Junior-B Curling Championships	Turkey (junior men)	5
2019	2019 World Junior-B Curling Championships	Turkey (junior women)	11
2020	2020 World Qualification Event	Turkey (women)	3rd place, bronze medalist(s)
