= Joe Rea =

Canadian male curler and coach

David Joseph Rea (Joe)
- Curler ♂
- Born: August 2, 1958 (age 68); Vancouver, British Columbia

Team
- Curling club: Prince George Golf and CC, Prince George, BC

Curling career
- Member Association: Canada
Medal record
Curling

Joe Rea (born August 2, 1958) is a Canadian male curler and coach.

== Record as a coach of national teams ==
Year	Tournament, event	National team	Place
2005	2005 World Wheelchair Curling Championship	Canada (wheelchair)	6
2006	2006 Winter Paralympics	Canada (wheelchair)	1st place, gold medalist(s)
2007	2007 World Wheelchair Curling Championship	Canada (wheelchair)	4
2008	2008 World Wheelchair Curling Championship	Canada (wheelchair)	4
2009	2009 World Wheelchair Curling Championship	Canada (wheelchair)	1st place, gold medalist(s)
2010	2010 Winter Paralympics	Canada (wheelchair)	1st place, gold medalist(s)
2011	2011 World Wheelchair Curling Championship	Canada (wheelchair)	1st place, gold medalist(s)
2012	2012 World Wheelchair Curling Championship	Canada (wheelchair)	7
2013	2013 World Wheelchair Curling Championship	Canada (wheelchair)	1st place, gold medalist(s)
2014	2014 Winter Paralympics	Canada (wheelchair)	1st place, gold medalist(s)
2015	2015 World Wheelchair Curling Championship	Canada (wheelchair)	6
