= 2011 World Wheelchair Curling Championship =

- Host city: Prague, Czech Republic
- Arena: Curling Hall Roztyly
- Dates: February 22 - March 1, 2011
- Winner: Canada
- Skip: Jim Armstrong
- Third: Darryl Neighbour
- Second: Ina Forrest
- Lead: Sonja Gaudet
- Alternate: Bruno Yizek
- Coach: Joe Rea
- Finalist: Scotland (Aileen Neilson)

The 2011 World Wheelchair Curling Championship was held in Prague, Czech Republic from February 22 - March 1, 2011. Ten mixed gender teams competed for four playoff spots. In the final, Canada's Jim Armstrong defeated Scotland's Aileen Neilson in the final in seven ends. Teams also gained qualification points from this event for the 2014 Winter Paralympic Games in Sochi.

== Qualification ==
- Czech Republic (Host country)
- Top seven finishers from the 2009 World Wheelchair Curling Championship:
  - Canada
  - Germany
  - Norway
  - Scotland
  - South Korea
  - Sweden
  - United States
- Top teams from qualifying event:
  - China
  - Russia

=== Qualification event ===
Two teams outside of the top seven finishers qualified from a qualifying event held in November 2010 in Lohja, Finland.

== Teams ==
The teams are as listed below:

Canada	China	Czech Republic	Germany	Norway
Skip: Jim Armstrong; Third: Darryl Neighbour; Second: Ina Forrest; Lead: Sonja Gaudet; Alternate: Bruno Yizek; Coach: Joe Rea	Skip: Wang Haitao; Third: Liu Wei; Second: Xu Guangqin; Lead: He Jun; Alternate: Zhang Qiang; Coach: Li Hongchen	Skip: Radek Pokorný; Third: Martin Tluk; Second: Radek Musílek; Lead: Michaela Charvátocá; Alternate: Jana Břinčilová; Coach: Kateřina Urbanová	Fourth: Jens Gäbel; Skip: Marcus Sieger; Second: Stefan Deuschl; Lead: Christiane Steger; Alternate: Heike Melchior; Coach: Helmar Erlewein	Skip: Rune Lorentsen; Third: Jostein Stordahl; Second: Tone Edvardsen; Lead: Terje Rafdal; Alternate: Runar Bjørnstad; Coach: Thoralf Hognestad
Russia	Scotland	South Korea	Sweden	United States
Fourth: Andrey Smirnov; Skip: Marat Romanov; Second: Alexander Shevchenko; Lead: Svetlana Pakhomova; Alternate: Oxana Slesarenko; Coach: Vladimir Shevchenko, Anton Batugin	Skip: Aileen Neilson; Third: Tom Killin; Second: Gregor Ewan; Lead: Angie Malone; Alternate: Michael McKenzie; Coach: Sheila Swan	Skip: Jeong Tae-yeong; Third: Kuon Gi-teak; Second: Yang Hae-nam; Lead: Jung Young-ah; Alternate: Kang Oe-jeong; Coach: Woo Jin Kim	Skip: Glenn Ikonen; Third: Patrik Burman; Second: Patrik Kallin; Lead: Kicki Ulander; Alternate: Gert Erlandsson; Coach: Jalle Jungnell	Skip: Augusto Perez; Third: Jim Pierce; Second: Jimmy Joseph; Lead: Jacqui Kapinowski; Alternate: Penny Greely; Coach: Steve Brown

== Standings ==
Final round-robin standings

Country	Skip	W	L	PF	PA	Ends Won	Ends Lost	Blank Ends	Stolen Ends
Canada	Jim Armstrong	9	0	58	28	35	21	4	22
Norway	Rune Lorentsen	6	3	50	48	34	31	2	12
Russia	Marat Romanov	6	3	54	42	30	26	4	16
Scotland	Aileen Neilson	6	3	58	42	34	28	5	17
China	Wang Haitao	5	4	51	36	28	30	1	12
South Korea	Jeong Tae-yeong	4	5	54	55	31	32	4	12
United States	Augusto Perez	3	6	60	54	36	29	2	16
Sweden	Glenn Ikonen	2	7	40	62	26	38	1	12
Germany	Marcus Sieger	2	7	40	72	26	30	3	9
Czech Republic	Radek Pokorný	2	7	34	64	31	34	0	15

== Results ==
All times local (Central European Time)

=== Draw 1 ===
Tuesday, February 22, 9:30am

Sheet A	1	2	3	4	5	6	7	8	Final
Norway (Lorentsen) 🔨	1	0	0	1	1	0	0	2	5
United States (Perez)	0	1	1	0	0	1	1	0	4

Sheet B	1	2	3	4	5	6	7	8	EE	Final
China (Wang) 🔨	1	2	0	0	1	1	0	0	0	5
Canada (Armstrong)	0	0	1	1	0	0	1	2	1	6

Sheet C	1	2	3	4	5	6	7	8	Final
Czech Republic (Pokorný) 🔨	0	0	0	1	1	1	1	0	4
Sweden (Ikonen)	1	1	3	0	0	0	0	1	6

Sheet D	1	2	3	4	5	6	7	8	Final
Germany (Sieger)	1	0	2	2	0	0	0	0	5
South Korea (Jeong) 🔨	0	3	0	0	0	0	3	1	7

=== Draw 2 ===
Tuesday, February 22, 2:30pm

Sheet A	1	2	3	4	5	6	7	8	Final
Scotland (Neilson)	0	0	0	1	0	1	0	1	3
Russia (Romanov) 🔨	1	1	2	0	1	0	2	0	7

Sheet B	1	2	3	4	5	6	7	8	Final
Sweden (Ikonen)	1	1	0	1	0	0	0	X	3
Norway (Lorentsen) 🔨	0	0	2	0	1	2	3	X	8

Sheet C	1	2	3	4	5	6	7	8	Final
South Korea (Jeong)	1	0	0	1	0	1	0	X	3
China (Wang) 🔨	0	3	3	0	1	0	2	X	9

Sheet D	1	2	3	4	5	6	7	8	Final
Canada (Armstrong) 🔨	0	3	0	1	0	1	0	0	5
United States (Perez)	0	0	1	0	1	0	1	1	4

=== Draw 3 ===
Wednesday, February 23, 9:30am

Sheet A	1	2	3	4	5	6	7	8	Final
South Korea (Jeong) 🔨	0	2	0	1	1	0	0	1	5
Canada (Armstrong)	0	0	2	0	0	3	1	0	6

Sheet B	1	2	3	4	5	6	7	8	Final
Scotland (Neilson) 🔨	0	0	2	3	1	3	1	X	10
Czech Republic (Pokorný)	1	1	0	0	0	0	0	X	2

Sheet C	1	2	3	4	5	6	7	8	Final
United States (Perez) 🔨	1	2	2	0	0	0	4	X	9
Germany (Sieger)	0	0	0	1	1	1	0	X	3

Sheet D	1	2	3	4	5	6	7	8	Final
Russia (Romanov)	0	0	0	2	0	1	0	X	3
Norway (Lorentsen) 🔨	2	0	1	0	3	0	1	X	8

=== Draw 4 ===
Wednesday, February 23, 2:30pm

Sheet A	1	2	3	4	5	6	7	8	Final
Sweden (Ikonen) 🔨	0	1	1	2	0	0	0	0	4
Scotland (Neilson)	2	0	0	0	1	1	2	1	7

Sheet B	1	2	3	4	5	6	7	8	EE	Final
Russia (Romanov) 🔨	2	0	0	1	0	4	0	0	1	8
Germany (Sieger)	0	2	0	0	1	0	2	2	0	7

Sheet D	1	2	3	4	5	6	7	8	Final
Czech Republic (Pokorný)	1	2	0	1	2	2	1	X	9
China (Wang) 🔨	0	0	3	0	0	0	0	X	3

=== Draw 5 ===
Thursday, February 24, 9:30am

Sheet A	1	2	3	4	5	6	7	8	Final
China (Wang)	0	2	0	0	1	0	0	X	3
Norway (Lorentsen) 🔨	1	0	2	1	0	1	1	X	6

Sheet B	1	2	3	4	5	6	7	8	Final
South Korea (Jeong)	2	2	0	0	5	0	1	X	10
Sweden (Ikonen) 🔨	0	0	2	1	0	3	0	X	6

Sheet C	1	2	3	4	5	6	7	8	Final
Russia (Romanov)	0	2	0	0	0	1	0	X	3
Canada (Armstrong) 🔨	1	0	2	0	2	0	2	X	7

Sheet D	1	2	3	4	5	6	7	8	Final
United States (Perez) 🔨	1	2	0	1	0	0	1	0	5
Scotland (Neilson)	0	0	4	0	0	1	0	1	6

=== Draw 6 ===
Thursday, February 24, 2:30pm

Sheet A	1	2	3	4	5	6	7	8	Final
Germany (Sieger)	0	3	1	0	2	0	0	X	6
Czech Republic (Pokorný) 🔨	1	0	0	1	0	1	1	X	4

Sheet B	1	2	3	4	5	6	7	8	Final
China (Wang)	2	2	0	4	0	3	0	X	11
United States (Perez) 🔨	0	0	1	0	2	0	1	X	4

Sheet C	1	2	3	4	5	6	7	8	Final
Norway (Lorentsen) 🔨	2	0	1	1	2	1	0	1	8
South Korea (Jeong)	0	4	0	0	0	0	3	0	7

Sheet D	1	2	3	4	5	6	7	8	Final
Sweden (Ikonen) 🔨	0	0	0	0	1	0	2	X	3
Canada (Armstrong)	2	1	2	1	0	1	0	X	7

=== Draw 7 ===
Friday, February 25, 9:30am

Sheet B	1	2	3	4	5	6	7	8	Final
Canada (Armstrong)	0	0	2	1	1	1	0	X	5
Czech Republic (Pokorný) 🔨	1	2	0	0	0	0	1	X	4

Sheet C	1	2	3	4	5	6	7	8	Final
Scotland (Neilson)	0	4	2	1	0	3	0	X	10
Germany (Sieger) 🔨	2	0	0	0	2	0	1	X	5

Sheet D	1	2	3	4	5	6	7	8	Final
South Korea (Jeong)	0	1	1	1	2	3	0	X	8
Russia (Romanov) 🔨	1	0	0	0	0	0	1	X	2

=== Draw 8 ===
Friday, February 25, 2:30pm

Sheet A	1	2	3	4	5	6	7	8	Final
United States (Perez) 🔨	0	0	1	3	2	0	0	X	6
Sweden (Ikonen)	1	4	0	0	0	1	3	X	9

Sheet B	1	2	3	4	5	6	7	8	Final
Norway (Lorentsen) 🔨	0	0	1	0	0	0	X	X	1
Scotland (Neilson)	0	1	0	2	3	3	X	X	9

Sheet C	1	2	3	4	5	6	7	8	Final
Czech Republic (Pokorný)	0	0	0	0	0	0	X	X	0
Russia (Romanov) 🔨	2	3	4	1	1	3	X	X	14

Sheet D	1	2	3	4	5	6	7	8	Final
China (Wang) 🔨	3	1	3	0	3	1	X	X	11
Germany (Sieger)	0	0	0	1	0	0	X	X	1

=== Draw 9 ===
Saturday, February 26, 9:30am

Sheet A	1	2	3	4	5	6	7	8	Final
Canada (Armstrong) 🔨	1	1	2	2	3	4	X	X	13
Germany (Sieger)	0	0	0	0	0	0	X	X	0

Sheet B	1	2	3	4	5	6	7	8	Final
Sweden (Ikonen)	0	1	0	1	0	0	1	X	3
China (Wang) 🔨	1	0	2	0	1	1	0	X	5

Sheet C	1	2	3	4	5	6	7	8	Final
South Korea (Jeong) 🔨	1	0	2	0	0	0	0	X	3
United States (Perez)	0	3	0	1	1	3	4	X	12

Sheet D	1	2	3	4	5	6	7	8	Final
Norway (Lorentsen)	0	0	0	1	2	1	0	0	4
Czech Republic (Pokorný) 🔨	1	1	2	0	0	0	1	1	6

=== Draw 10 ===
Saturday, February 26, 2:30pm

Sheet A	1	2	3	4	5	6	7	8	Final
Scotland (Neilson)	1	0	0	1	2	0	1	0	5
South Korea (Jeong) 🔨	0	0	1	0	0	2	0	1	4

Sheet B	1	2	3	4	5	6	7	8	EE	Final
United States (Perez) 🔨	0	3	1	0	1	1	1	0	0	7
Russia (Romanov)	1	0	0	5	0	0	0	1	2	9

Sheet C	1	2	3	4	5	6	7	8	Final
Canada (Armstrong)	2	1	1	0	3	0	0	X	7
Norway (Lorentsen) 🔨	0	0	0	2	0	1	1	X	4

=== Draw 11 ===
Sunday, February 27, 9:30am

Sheet A	1	2	3	4	5	6	7	8	Final
Czech Republic (Pokorný)	0	1	0	0	0	2	0	X	3
United States (Perez) 🔨	2	0	2	2	1	0	2	X	9

Sheet B	1	2	3	4	5	6	7	8	EE	Final
Germany (Sieger)	2	0	1	0	1	0	1	1	0	6
Norway (Lorentsen) 🔨	0	2	0	3	0	1	0	0	1	7

Sheet C	1	2	3	4	5	6	7	8	EE	Final
China (Wang)	0	2	0	0	1	0	0	1	1	5
Scotland (Neilson) 🔨	0	0	1	1	0	1	1	0	0	4

Sheet D	1	2	3	4	5	6	7	8	Final
Russia (Romanov)	0	2	1	2	2	1	0	X	8
Sweden (Ikonen) 🔨	0	0	0	0	0	0	3	X	3

=== Draw 12 ===
Sunday, February 27, 2:30pm

Sheet A	1	2	3	4	5	6	7	8	Final
Russia (Romanov)	0	1	1	1	0	0	3	X	6
China (Wang) 🔨	1	0	0	0	1	1	0	X	3

Sheet B	1	2	3	4	5	6	7	8	Final
Czech Republic (Pokorný) 🔨	1	0	0	0	1	0	0	X	2
South Korea (Jeong)	0	1	2	1	0	1	2	X	7

Sheet C	1	2	3	4	5	6	7	8	Final
Germany (Sieger) 🔨	0	1	0	3	0	2	1	X	7
Sweden (Ikonen)	1	0	1	0	1	0	0	X	3

Sheet D	1	2	3	4	5	6	7	8	Final
Scotland (Neilson) 🔨	0	1	0	0	3	0	0	X	4
Canada (Armstrong)	0	0	2	3	0	3	1	X	9

== Challenge Games ==
Monday, February 28, 9:30am

Sheet D	1	2	3	4	5	6	7	8	Final
Sweden (Ikonen) 🔨	1	0	1	1	0	1	0	X	4
Czech Republic (Pokorný)	0	0	0	0	1	0	1	X	2

Monday, February 28, 2:30pm

Sheet B	1	2	3	4	5	6	7	8	Final
Germany (Sieger) 🔨	1	0	2	0	0	3	0	0	6
Sweden (Ikonen)	0	2	0	1	2	0	2	1	8

== Playoffs ==
Page playoff system
1	Canada	7
2	Norway	4
3	Russia	5
4	Scotland	8

Semifinal
2	Norway	1
4	Scotland	12

Gold-medal game
1	Canada	7
4	Scotland	3

Bronze-medal game
2	Norway	8
3	Russia	3

=== 1 vs. 2 ===
Monday, February 28, 2:30pm

Sheet C	1	2	3	4	5	6	7	8	Final
Canada (Armstrong) 🔨	3	0	2	0	1	1	0	X	7
Norway (Lorentsen)	0	1	0	2	0	0	1	X	4

=== 3 vs. 4 ===
Monday, February 28, 2:30pm

Sheet A	1	2	3	4	5	6	7	8	EE	Final
Russia (Romanov) 🔨	1	0	1	1	1	0	1	0	0	5
Scotland (Neilson)	0	3	0	0	0	1	0	1	3	8

=== Semifinal ===
Tuesday, March 1, 9:30am

Sheet B	1	2	3	4	5	6	7	8	Final
Norway (Lorentsen)	0	0	0	1	0	0	X	X	1
Scotland (Neilson) 🔨	3	2	1	0	4	2	X	X	12

=== Bronze-medal game ===
Tuesday, March 1, 2:30pm

Sheet A	1	2	3	4	5	6	7	8	Final
Norway (Lorentsen) 🔨	0	2	2	1	2	0	1	X	8
Russia (Romanov)	2	0	0	0	0	1	0	X	3

=== Gold-medal game ===
Tuesday, March 1, 2:30pm

Sheet C	1	2	3	4	5	6	7	8	Final
Canada (Armstrong) 🔨	2	0	0	2	2	1	0	X	7
Scotland (Neilson)	0	1	1	0	0	0	1	X	3

2011 World Wheelchair Curling Championship
(Canada)
Canada
2nd title

== Final standings ==
The final standings of the tournament.

Rank	Team
1st place, gold medalist(s)	Canada
2nd place, silver medalist(s)	Scotland
3rd place, bronze medalist(s)	Norway
4	Russia
5	China
6	South Korea
7	United States
8	Sweden
9	Germany
10	Czech Republic
