= Bruno Yizek =

Canadian wheelchair curler

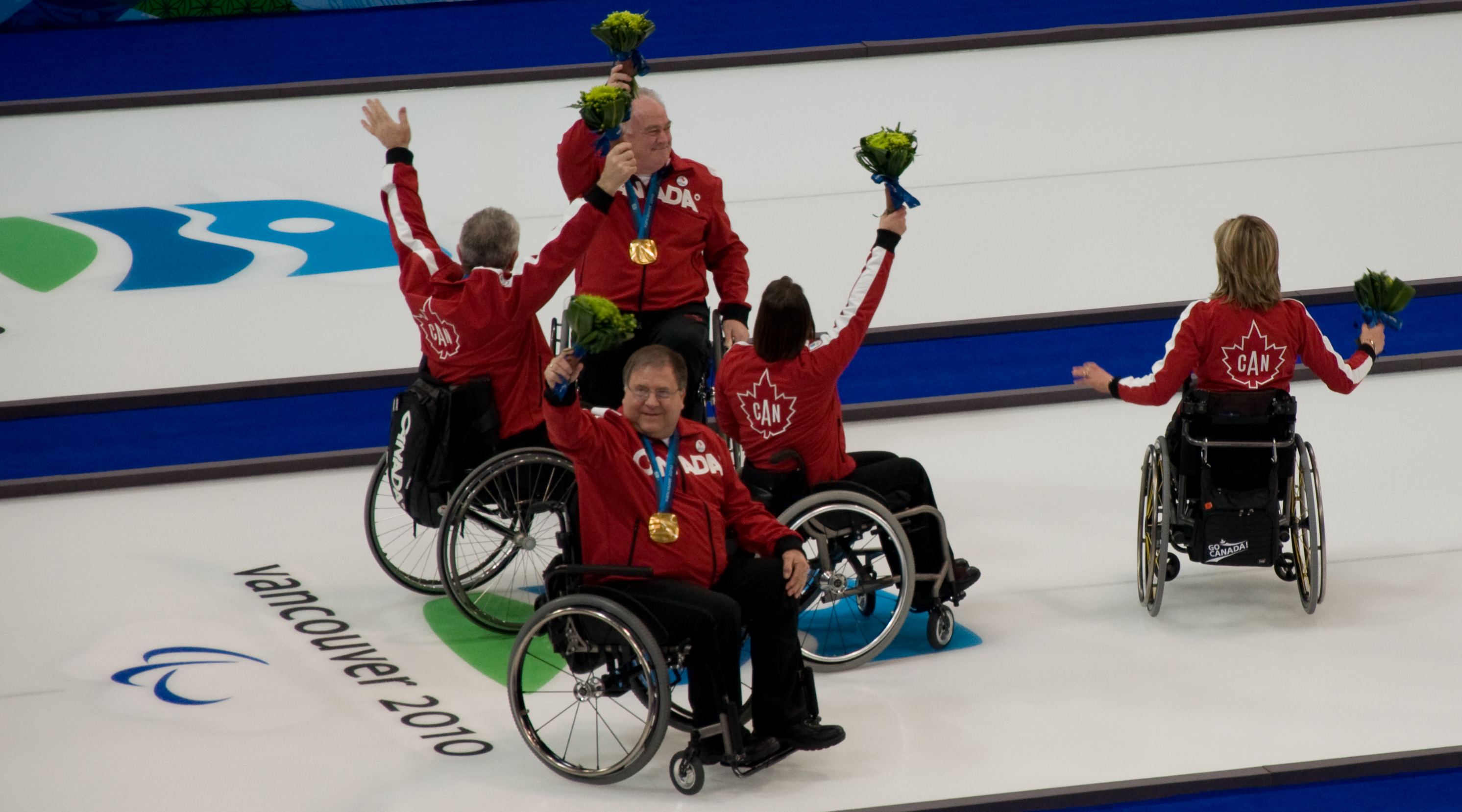
- Bruno Yizek (center front) with the Canadian team winning gold at Vancouver 2010
Medal record
Wheelchair curling
Paralympic Games
Gold medal – first place	2010 Vancouver
World Championship
Gold medal – first place	2011 Prague

Bruno Yizek (born December 10, 1948) is a Canadian wheelchair curler and Paralympian.

He competed with the Canadian team at the 2010 Paralympic Games in Vancouver, Canada, where they took the gold medal. He also took gold at the 2011 World Wheelchair Curling Championship in Prague, Czech Republic.
