= Meghan Lino =

American wheelchair curler

- Curler
- Born: August 13, 1984 (age 42); Falmouth, Massachusetts, U.S.

Curling career
- World Wheelchair Championship: 3 (2013, 2015, 2019)
- Paralympic: 2 (2014, 2018)

Meghan Lino (born August 13, 1984) is an American wheelchair curler who competes in international level events.
