= Bob McPherson =

British wheelchair curler

- Curler
- Born: 22 November 1968 (age 57); Motherwell, Scotland

Curling career
- World Wheelchair Championship: 5 (2013, 2017, 2019, 2020, 2024)
- Paralympic: 2 (2014, 2018)
Medal record
Wheelchair curling
Representing Great Britain
Winter Paralympic Games
Bronze medal – third place	2014 Sochi
Representing Scotland
World Championships
Silver medal – second place	2019 Stirling
Bronze medal – third place	2017 Gangneung

Robert "Bob" McPherson (born 22 November 1968) is a British wheelchair curler from Scotland.

McPherson made his paralympic debut at the 2014 Winter Paralympics in Sochi, Russia. He won a bronze medal, with the British team beating China 7–3 in the third-place play-off match.

McPherson also competed on the British Paralympic curling team for the 2018 Paralympics, where they missed the playoffs, finishing 7th with a record of 5–6.
