= František Pitoňák =

Slovak curler and coach

- Curler ♂
- Born: 3 June 1973 (age 53); Rakúsy, Kežmarok District, Czechoslovakia

Curling career
- Member Association: Slovakia
- World Mixed Doubles Championship: 1 (2011)
- European Championship: 11 (2006, 2007, 2008, 2009, 2010, 2011, 2012, 2015, 2017, 2018, 2019)
- Other appearances: European Mixed Championship: 2 (2012, 2013)
Medal record
Curling

František Pitoňák (born 3 June 1973 in Rakúsy, Kežmarok District, Czechoslovakia) is a Slovak male curler and curling coach.

As a coach of Slovak wheelchair curling team he participated in 2014 and 2018 Winter Paralympics.

== Teams ==
=== Men's ===
Season	Skip	Third	Second	Lead	Alternate	Coach	Events
2005–06	Milan Kajan	František Pitoňák	Radomir Vozar	Boris Kutka			
2006–07	František Pitoňák	Boris Kutka	Milan Kajan	Rene Petko	Karel Pospichal		ECC 2006 (19th)
2007–08	Pavol Pitoňák	František Pitoňák	Tomáš Pitoňák	Peter Pitoňák	Milan Kalis	Gerry "Soupy" Campbell	ECC 2007 (17th)
2008–09	Pavol Pitoňák	František Pitoňák	Tomáš Pitoňák	Peter Pitoňák	Stefan Turna	Gerry "Soupy" Campbell	ECC 2008 (21st)
2009–10	Pavol Pitoňák	František Pitoňák	Tomáš Pitoňák	Peter Pitoňák	Stefan Turna	Gerry "Soupy" Campbell	ECC 2009 (28th)
2010–11	Pavol Pitoňák	František Pitoňák	Tomáš Pitoňák	Peter Pitoňák		Gerry "Soupy" Campbell	ECC 2010 (14th)
2011–12	Pavol Pitoňák	František Pitoňák	Tomáš Pitoňák	Peter Pitoňák	Milan Kajan	Gerry "Soupy" Campbell	ECC 2011 (24th)
2012–13	Pavol Pitoňák	František Pitoňák	Tomáš Pitoňák	Peter Pitoňák	Rene Petko	Gerry "Soupy" Campbell	ECC 2012 (23rd)
2014–15	Pavol Pitoňák	František Pitoňák	Tomáš Pitoňák	Peter Pitoňák	Juraj Gallo		ECC 2014 (28th)
2015–16	David Misun (fourth)	Patrik Kapralik	Juraj Gallo (skip)	Jakub Polak	František Pitoňák	Marina Gallova	ECC 2015 (19th)
2017–18	David Misun (fourth)	Patrik Kapralik	Juraj Gallo (skip)	Jakub Polak	František Pitoňák	Alan Mitchell	ECC 2017 (10th)
2018–19	Pavol Pitoňák	František Pitoňák	Tomáš Pitoňák	Peter Pitoňák			ECC 2018 (22nd)
2019–20	Pavol Pitoňák	František Pitoňák	Tomáš Pitoňák	Peter Pitoňák			ECC 2019 (25th)

=== Mixed ===
Season	Skip	Third	Second	Lead	Coach	Events
2012–13	Pavol Pitoňák	Gabriela Kajanová	František Pitoňák	Petra Pitoňáková		EMxCC 2012 (9th)
2013–14	Pavol Pitoňák	Daniela Matulová	František Pitoňák	Zuzana Axamitová	Vladimira Pitoňáková	EMxCC 2013 (8th)

=== Mixed doubles ===
Season	Male	Female	Coach	Events
2010–11	František Pitoňák	Petra Pitoňáková	Klaudia Repaciková	WMDCC 2011 (15th)

== Record as a coach of national teams ==
Year	Tournament, event	National team	Place
2006	2006 European Junior Curling Challenge	Slovakia (junior men)	11
2008	2008 European Junior Curling Challenge	Slovakia (junior women)	8
2009	2008 European Junior Curling Challenge	Slovakia (junior women)	9
2010	2010 World Wheelchair Curling Qualification	Slovakia (wheelchair)	6
2011	2012 World Wheelchair Curling Qualification	Slovakia (wheelchair)	1st place, gold medalist(s)
2012	2012 World Wheelchair Curling Championship	Slovakia (wheelchair)	4
2013	2013 World Wheelchair Curling Championship	Slovakia (wheelchair)	7
2014	2014 Winter Paralympics	Slovakia (wheelchair)	6
2015	2015 World Wheelchair Curling Championship	Slovakia (wheelchair)	4
2015	2015 European Curling Championships (C Division)	Slovakia (men)	2nd place, silver medalist(s)
2016	2016 World Wheelchair Curling Championship	Slovakia (wheelchair)	9
2016	2016 World Wheelchair-B Curling Championship	Slovakia (wheelchair)	3rd place, bronze medalist(s)
2018	2018 Winter Paralympics	Slovakia (wheelchair)	9
2019	2019 World Wheelchair Curling Championship	Slovakia (wheelchair)	6
2020	2020 World Wheelchair Curling Championship	Slovakia (wheelchair)	8
2021	2021 World Wheelchair Curling Championship	Slovakia (wheelchair)	10
2022	2022 Winter Paralympics	Slovakia (wheelchair)	4

== Personal life ==
He is from big family of curlers: three of his brothers (Pavol, Tomáš and Peter) are František's teammates, they played together many times on European championships and other international curling tournaments; one more his brother Dušan played wheelchair curling (František coaches their wheelchair team on Worlds and Winter Paralympics); other family members also are curlers or coaches.
