= Gregor Ewan =

Scottish wheelchair curler

- Curler
- Born: 28 June 1971 (age 55); Dundee, Scotland

Curling career
- World Wheelchair Championship: 8 (2011, 2012, 2013, 2015, 2017, 2021, 2023, 2024)
- Paralympic: 3 (2014, 2018, 2022)
Medal record
Wheelchair curling
Representing Great Britain
Winter Paralympic Games
Bronze medal – third place	2014 Sochi	Mixed competition
World Wheelchair Championship
Silver medal – second place	2011 Prague	Mixed Team
Bronze medal – third place	2017 Gangneung	Mixed Team
Bronze medal – third place	2023 Richmond	Mixed Team

Gregor Ewan (born 28 June 1971) is a Scottish wheelchair curler who competed for Great Britain at the 2014 Winter Paralympics. It was his Paralympic debut.

== Career ==
He won a bronze medal at the 2014 Winter Paralympics at Sochi with the British team beating China 7–3 in the third-place play-off match.
