= Sissel Løchen =

Norwegian wheelchair curler

- Curler
- Born: 17 June 1969 (age 57); Bryne, Norway

Curling career
- Paralympic: 3 (2014, 2018, 2022)
Medal record
Wheelchair curling
Representing Norway
Winter Paralympics
Silver medal – second place	2018 Pyeongchang	Mixed

Sissel Løchen (born 17 June 1969) is a Norwegian wheelchair curling player and psychiatric nurse.

== Early life ==
Løchen was born on 17 June 1969 in Bryne, Norway.

== Career ==
She participated at the 2014 Winter Paralympics and won a silver medal at the 2018 Winter Paralympics.

Løchen participated in both the 2012 World Wheelchair Curling Championship and the 2013 World Wheelchair Curling Championship for Norway.
