= Jim Gault =

British wheelchair curler and Paralympic medalist

Personal information
- Born: 24 April 1954 (age 72)

Sport
- Country: Scotland; Great Britain
- Sport: Wheelchair curling

Achievements and titles
- Paralympic finals: 2014
Medal record
Wheelchair curling
Representing Great Britain
Winter Paralympic Games
Bronze medal – third place	2014 Sochi	Mixed competition
- Updated on 16 March 2014

Jim Gault (born 24 April 1954) is a wheelchair curler who competed for Great Britain at the 2014 Winter Paralympics after being called up as a replacement for Tom Killin who pulled out due to illness. This will be his Paralympic debut.

He won a bronze medal at the 2014 Winter Paralympics at Sochi with the British team beating China 7–3 in the third-place play-off match.
