= Liu Wei (curler) =

Chinese wheelchair curler

- Curler ♂
- Born: 15 August 1984 (age 42)

Curling career
- World Wheelchair Championship: 7 (2009, 2011, 2012, 2013, 2015, 2017, 2020)
- Paralympic: 2 (2014, 2018)
Medal record
Wheelchair curling
Representing China
Paralympic Games
Gold medal – first place	2018 PyeongChang	Mixed team

Liu Wei (Chinese: 刘微; pinyin: Liú Wēi, born 15 August 1984) was part of the Chinese team that won gold in Wheelchair curling at the 2018 Winter Paralympics. He had poliomyelitis in youth.
