= Penny Greely =

American Paralympian curler and sitting volleyball player

Personal information
- Full name: Penny Ricker Greely
- Born: 10 March 1971 (age 55) Green Bay, Wisconsin, United States

Sport
- Country: United States
- Sport: Sitting volleyball, Wheelchair curling
Medal record
Summer Paralympics
Sitting Volleyball
Bronze medal – third place	2004 Athens	Sitting Volleyball - Women's
Winter Paralympics
Wheelchair curling

Penny Ricker Greely (born March 10, 1971, in Green Bay, Wisconsin) is a three time Paralympian for Team USA. She competes as a wheelchair curler and competed as a sitting volleyball player. She played in the bronze medal-winning United States team in Volleyball at the 2004 Summer Paralympics and competed in Wheelchair curling at the 2014 Winter Paralympics and the 2018 Winter Paralympics.

== Athletic career ==
Greely began her Paralympic career as a sitting volleyball player in the 2004 Summer Paralympics in Athens, Greece, where she earned a bronze medal. She competed in the 2003 Parapan American Games to qualify for the 2004 Paralympic Team. She has since retired from sitting volleyball.

Greely began wheelchair curling in July 2010. She competed in her first international competition in Prague, Czechoslovakia, in February 2011. She has since competed in over a dozen countries internationally, including Finland, Slovakia, Switzerland, Scotland, South Korea, and Russia. She made her Paralympic debut in wheelchair curling at the 2014 Winter Paralympics held in Sochi, Russia. Greely has represented Team USA in five world championships in wheelchair curling. Greely and her teammates first won an international competition in wheelchair curling at the Finnish International Wheelchair Open in Lohja, Finland. She was selected for the 2018 Paralympic wheelchair curling team. Her wheelchair curling position is Lead. Her 2018 teammates include Kirk Black, Steve Emt, Justin Marshall, and Meghan Lino.

She practices curling at the Green Bay Curling Club. Her coach is Rusty Schieber.

== Personal life ==
She currently works as a case worker for Brown County, WI. She has a husband and one son.
