= Li Jianrui =

Chinese male curler and coach

- Curler ♂

Curling career
- Member Association: China
Medal record
Curling

Li Jianrui is a Chinese male curler and curling coach.

== Record as a coach of national teams ==
Year	Tournament, event	National team	Place
2012	2012 World Wheelchair Curling Championship	China (wheelchair)	3rd place, bronze medalist(s)
2013	2013 World Wheelchair Curling Championship	China (wheelchair)	3rd place, bronze medalist(s)
2014	2014 Winter Paralympics	China (wheelchair)	4
2015	2015 World Wheelchair Curling Championship	China (wheelchair)	2nd place, silver medalist(s)
2017	2017 World Wheelchair Curling Championship	China (wheelchair)	4
2019	2019 World Wheelchair Curling Championship	China (wheelchair)	1st place, gold medalist(s)
2020	2020 World Wheelchair Curling Championship	China (wheelchair)	4
2023	2023 World Wheelchair Curling Championship	China (wheelchair)	1st place, gold medalist(s)
