= Aileen Neilson =

Scottish wheelchair curler

Personal information
- Nickname: Mother Goose
- Nationality: Scottish
- Born: 15 August 1971 (age 54) East Kilbride, Scotland

Sport
- Country: Scotland; Great Britain
- Sport: Wheelchair curling
Medal record
Wheelchair curling
Representing Great Britain
Winter Paralympic Games
| Bronze medal – third place | 2014 Sochi | Mixed competition |
Representing Scotland
World Championships
| Silver medal – second place | 2011 Prague | Mixed competition |
| Silver medal – second place | 2019 Stirling | Mixed competition |
| Bronze medal – third place | 2007 Sollefteå | Mixed competition |
- Updated on 10 March 2019

Aileen Neilson (born 15 August 1971) is a Scottish wheelchair curler. She is the first woman to skip a wheelchair curling team in either the Paralympic Games (2010) or World Championships (2011).

== Career ==
Although she comes from a family of curlers Neilson only took up the sport in 2004 at the age of 33. She subsequently made her international debut in 2006.

She was part of the Great Britain wheelchair curling team at the 2010 Paralympic Games in Vancouver, Canada.

She has a bronze medal from the 2007 World Wheelchair Curling Championship and a silver from the 2011 World Wheelchair Curling Championship.

She won a bronze medal at the 2014 Winter Paralympics at Sochi with the British team beating China 7–3 in the third-place play-off match.

She is a teacher at Bent Primary School in South Lanarkshire. Her partner is former teammate and predecessor as skip of the British Paralympic rink Michael McCreadie.
