= Zhang Qiang (curler) =

Chinese wheelchair curler

- Curler ♂
- Born: 4 May 1979 (age 47)

Curling career
- Member Association: China
- World Wheelchair Championship: 7 (2011, 2012, 2013, 2015, 2019, 2024, 2025)
- Paralympic: 3 (2014, 2018, 2026)
Medal record
Wheelchair curling
Representing China
Paralympic Games
Gold medal – first place	2018 PyeongChang	Mixed team
Silver medal – second place	2026 Milano Cortina	Mixed team

Zhang Qiang (Chinese: 张强; pinyin: Zhāng Qiáng; born 4 May 1979) was part of the Chinese team that won gold in Wheelchair curling at the 2018 Winter Paralympics. He also competed at the 2014 Winter Paralympics.
