= Pierino Gaspard =

Italian wheelchair curler and alpine skier

- Curler ♂
- Born: 24 November 1954 (age 71)

Curling career
- Member Association: Italy
- World Wheelchair Championship: 6 (2002, 2004, 2005, 2008, 2009, 2012)
- Paralympic: 1 (2006)
Medal record
Wheelchair curling

Pierino Gaspard (born 24 November 1954) is an Italian wheelchair curler and alpine skier.

As wheelchair curler he participated in the 2006 Winter Paralympics where Italian team finished on seventh place.

As alpine skier he participated in the 1992 and 1994 Winter Paralympics.

== Wheelchair curling teams ==
Season	Skip	Third	Second	Lead	Alternate	Coach	Events
2003–04	Egidio Marchese	Orazio Fagone	Rita Dal Monte	Fabio Tripodi	Pierino Gaspard	Mauro Maino	WWhCC 2004 (6th)
2004–05	Egidio Marchese	Orazio Fagone	Lucrezia Celentano	Danilo Destro	Pierino Gaspard	Mauro Maino	WWhCC 2005 (9th)
2005–06	Egidio Marchese	Andrea Tabanelli	Pierino Gaspard	Rita Dal Monte	Emanuele Spelorzi		WPG 2006 (7th)

== Alpine skiing results ==
Winter Paralympics Year	Event	Rank
1992	Men's Slalom LW2	16
1992	Men's Giant Slalom LW2	9
1992	Men's Downhill LW2	18
1994	Men's Slalom LW2	DNF
1994	Men's Giant Slalom LW2	DNF
1994	Men's Super-G LW2	21
1994	Men's Downhill LW2	DSQ
