= Gabriele Dallapiccola =

Italian wheelchair curler and Paralympian

- Curler ♂
- Born: 30 October 1976 (age 50); Trento

Team
- Curling club: Ass. Sportiva Dilettantistica Disabili Sportivi Valdostani, Saint-Christophe, Aosta Valley

Curling career
- Member Association: Italy
- World Wheelchair Championship: 2 (2008, 2009)
- Paralympic: 1 (2010)
Medal record
Wheelchair curling

Gabriele Dallapiccola (born 30 October 1976 in Trento) is an Italian wheelchair curler.

He participated in the 2010 Winter Paralympics where Italian team finished on fifth place.

== Teams ==
Season	Skip	Third	Second	Lead	Alternate	Coach	Events
2006–07	Andrea Tabanelli	Egidio Marchese	Emanuele Spelorzi	Laura Arnanaschi	Gabriele Dallapiccola	Mauro Maino	WWhCQ 2006 (bronze)
2007–08	Andrea Tabanelli	Egidio Marchese	Danilo Destro	Lucrezia Celentano	Gabriele Dallapiccola		WWhCQ 2007 (silver)
2007–08	Andrea Tabanelli	Egidio Marchese	Gabriele Dallapiccola	Lucrezia Celentano	Danilo Destro	Mauro Maino	WWhCC 2008 (5th)
2008–09	Andrea Tabanelli	Egidio Marchese	Emanuele Spelorzi	Lucrezia Celentano	Gabriele Dallapiccola	Mauro Maino	WWhCC 2009 (9th)
2009–10	Andrea Tabanelli	Egidio Marchese	Gabriele Dallapiccola	Angela Menardi	Emanuele Spelorzi	Mauro Maino	WPG 2010 (5th)
2010–11	Egidio Marchese	Gabriele Dallapiccola	Angela Menardi	Emanuele Spelorzi	Andrea Tabanelli		WWhCQ 2010 (bronze)
2012–13	Paolo Ioriatti	Gabriele Dallapiccola	Sergio Deflorian	Lucrezia Celentano	Rosanna Menazzi	Giulio Regli	WWhCQ 2012 (bronze)
2015–16	Paolo Ioriatti	Gabriele Dallapiccola	Lucrezia Celentano	Orietta Berto	Marco Salamone	Gianandrea Gallinatto	WWhBCC 2015 (7th)
2019–20	Egidio Marchese (fourth)	Paolo Ioriatti (skip)	Gabriele Dallapiccola	Angela Menardi	Orietta Berto	Violetta Caldart, Amanda Bianchi	WWhBCC 2019 (5th)
