= Fabio Tripodi =

Italian wheelchair curler

- Curler ♂
- Born: 22 May 1973 (age 53)

Team
- Curling club: Ass. Sportiva Dilettantistica Disabili Sportivi Valdostani, Saint-Christophe, Aosta Valley

Curling career
- Member Association: Italy
- World Wheelchair Championship: 2 (2002, 2004)
Medal record
Wheelchair curling

Fabio Tripodi (born 22 May 1973) is an Italian wheelchair curler.

== Teams ==
Season	Skip	Third	Second	Lead	Alternate	Coach	Events
2001–02	Andrea Tabanelli	Egidio Marchese	Federica Trota	Fabio Tripodi		Mauro Maino	WWhCC 2002 (8th)
2003–04	Egidio Marchese	Orazio Fagone	Rita Dal Monte	Fabio Tripodi	Pierino Gaspard	Mauro Maino	WWhCC 2004 (6th)
2018–19	Egidio Marchese	Orazio Fagone	Rita Dal Monte	Fabio Tripodi	Pierino Gaspard	Mauro Maino	IWhCC 2019 (8th)
