= Egidio Marchese =

Italian wheelchair curler and Paralympian

- Curler ♂
- Born: 28 November 1968 (age 57)

Team
- Curling club: Ass. Sportiva Dilettantistica Disabili Sportivi Valdostani, Saint-Christophe, Aosta Valley

Curling career
- Member Association: Italy
- World Wheelchair Championship: 8 (2002, 2004, 2005, 2008, 2009, 2012, 2024, 2025)
- Paralympic: 3 (2006, 2010, 2026)
Medal record
Wheelchair curling

Egidio Marchese (born 28 November 1968) is an Italian wheelchair curler.

He participated in the 2006 and 2010 Winter Paralympics, where the Italian team finished in seventh and fifth places respectively.

== Teams ==
Season	Skip	Third	Second	Lead	Alternate	Coach	Events
2001–02	Andrea Tabanelli	Egidio Marchese	Federica Trota	Fabio Tripodi		Mauro Maino	WWhCC 2002 (8th)
2003–04	Egidio Marchese	Orazio Fagone	Rita Dal Monte	Fabio Tripodi	Pierino Gaspard	Mauro Maino	WWhCC 2004 (6th)
2004–05	Egidio Marchese	Orazio Fagone	Lucrezia Celentano	Danilo Destro	Pierino Gaspard	Mauro Maino	WWhCC 2005 (9th)
2005–06	Egidio Marchese	Andrea Tabanelli	Pierino Gaspard	Rita Dal Monte	Emanuele Spelorzi		WPG 2006 (7th)
2006–07	Andrea Tabanelli	Egidio Marchese	Emanuele Spelorzi	Laura Arnanaschi	Gabriele Dallapiccola	Mauro Maino	WWhCQ 2006 (bronze)
2007–08	Andrea Tabanelli	Egidio Marchese	Danilo Destro	Lucrezia Celentano	Gabriele Dallapiccola		WWhCQ 2007 (silver)
2007–08	Andrea Tabanelli	Egidio Marchese	Gabriele Dallapiccola	Lucrezia Celentano	Danilo Destro	Mauro Maino	WWhCC 2008 (5th)
2008–09	Andrea Tabanelli	Egidio Marchese	Emanuele Spelorzi	Lucrezia Celentano	Gabriele Dallapiccola	Mauro Maino	WWhCC 2009 (9th)
2009–10	Andrea Tabanelli	Egidio Marchese	Gabriele Dallapiccola	Angela Menardi	Emanuele Spelorzi	Mauro Maino	WPG 2010 (5th)
2010–11	Egidio Marchese	Gabriele Dallapiccola	Angela Menardi	Emanuele Spelorzi	Andrea Tabanelli		WWhCQ 2010 (bronze)
2011–12	Andrea Tabanelli	Egidio Marchese	Emanuele Spelorzi	Angela Menardi	Rosanna Menazzi	Giulo Regli	WWhCQ 2011 (silver); WWhCC 2012 (10th)
2014–15	Egidio Marchese (fourth)	Emanuele Spelorzi (skip)	Sergio Deflorian	Angela Menardi	Rita Dal Monte	Roberto Maino	WWhCQ 2014 (5th)
2016–17	Andrea Tabanelli	Egidio Marchese	Emanuele Spelorzi	Rita Dal Monte	Giovanni Fabrizio Ferrero	Roberto Maino	WWhBCC 2016 (14th)
2018–19	Egidio Marchese (fourth)	Paolo Ioriatti (skip)	Matteo Ronzani	Angela Menardi	Orietta Berto	Sören Gran, Marco Mariani, Gianandrea Gallinatto	WWhBCC 2018 (7th)
2019–20	Egidio Marchese (fourth)	Paolo Ioriatti (skip)	Gabriele Dallapiccola	Angela Menardi	Orietta Berto	Violetta Caldart, Amanda Bianchi	WWhBCC 2019 (5th)
2023–24	Egidio Marchese	Fabrizio Bich	Matteo Ronzani	Angela Menardi	Orietta Berto	Roberto Maino	WWhCC 2024 (8th)
2024–25	Egidio Marchese	Fabrizio Bich	Matteo Ronzani	Angela Menardi	Emanuele Spelorzi	Roberto Maino	WWhCC 2025 (10th)
