= Emanuele Spelorzi =

Italian wheelchair curler and Paralympian

- Curler ♂
- Born: 18 August 1975 (age 51)

Team
- Curling club: Sport di Più, Turin

Curling career
- Member Association: Italy
- World Wheelchair Championship: 3 (2009, 2012, 2025)
- Paralympic: 2 (2006, 2010)
Medal record
Wheelchair curling

Emanuele Spelorzi (born 18 August 1975) is an Italian wheelchair curler.

He participated in the 2006 and 2010 Winter Paralympics where Italian team finished on seventh and fifth places respectively.

== Teams ==
Season	Skip	Third	Second	Lead	Alternate	Coach	Events
2005–06	Egidio Marchese	Andrea Tabanelli	Pierino Gaspard	Rita Dal Monte	Emanuele Spelorzi		WPG 2006 (7th)
2006–07	Andrea Tabanelli	Egidio Marchese	Emanuele Spelorzi	Laura Arnanaschi	Gabriele Dallapiccola	Mauro Maino	WWhCQ 2006 (bronze)
2008–09	Andrea Tabanelli	Egidio Marchese	Emanuele Spelorzi	Lucrezia Celentano	Gabriele Dallapiccola	Mauro Maino	WWhCC 2009 (9th)
2009–10	Andrea Tabanelli	Egidio Marchese	Gabriele Dallapiccola	Angela Menardi	Emanuele Spelorzi	Mauro Maino	WPG 2010 (5th)
2010–11	Egidio Marchese	Gabriele Dallapiccola	Angela Menardi	Emanuele Spelorzi	Andrea Tabanelli		WWhCQ 2010 (bronze)
2011–12	Andrea Tabanelli	Egidio Marchese	Emanuele Spelorzi	Angela Menardi	Rosanna Menazzi	Giulo Regli	WWhCQ 2010 (silver); WWhCC 2012 (10th)
2014–15	Egidio Marchese (fourth)	Emanuele Spelorzi (skip)	Sergio Deflorian	Angela Menardi	Rita Dal Monte	Roberto Maino	WWhCQ 2014 (5th)
2016–17	Andrea Tabanelli	Egidio Marchese	Emanuele Spelorzi	Rita Dal Monte	Giovanni Fabrizio Ferrero	Roberto Maino	WWhBCC 2016 (14th)
2019–20	Gabriele Dallapiccola	Emanuele Spelorzi	Matteo Ronzani	Orietta Berto			
2024–25	Egidio Marchese	Fabrizio Bich	Matteo Ronzani	Angela Menardi	Emanuele Spelorzi	Roberto Maino	WWhCC 2025 (10th)
