= Yoji Nakajima =

Japanese wheelchair curler and Paralympian

Yoji Nakajima 中島洋治
- Curler ♂
- Born: March 16, 1964 (age 62); Minamiaiki, Japan

Team
- Curling club: Shinshu Chair Curling Club

Curling career
- Member Association: Japan
- World Wheelchair Championship: 3 (2005, 2007, 2008)
- World Wheelchair Mixed Doubles Championship: 1 (2025)
- Paralympic: 2 (2010, 2026)
Medal record
Wheelchair curling
Representing Japan
World Mixed Doubles Championship
Gold medal – first place	2025 Stevenston

Yoji Nakajima (中島 洋治, Nakajima Yoji; born March 16, 1964) is a Japanese wheelchair curler. He is a world champion in 2025 together with his partner Aki Ogawa, becoming the first Japanese world champion in mixed doubles. Previously, he was participated in the 2010 Winter Paralympics where Japanese team finished on fifth place.

== Teams ==
Season	Skip	Third	Second	Lead	Alternate	Coach	Events
2004–05	Yoji Nakajima	Katsuo Ichikawa	Takashi Hidai	Ayako Saitoh	Toru Utumi	Kumiko Ogihara	WWhCC 2005 (13th)
2006–07	Yoji Nakajima	Katsuo Ichikawa	Takashi Hidai	Ayako Saitoh	Seiji Uchida	Kumiko Ogihara	WWhCQ 2006 (silver); WWhCC 2007 (5th)
2007–08	Yoji Nakajima	Katsuo Ichikawa	Takashi Hidai	Ayako Saitoh	Mari Yamazaki	Kumiko Ogihara	WWhCC 2008 (9th)
2008–09	Yoji Nakajima	Katsuo Ichikawa	Takashi Hidai	Ayako Saitoh		Emi Kaneko, Satako Ogawa	WWhCQ 2008 (6th)
2009–10	Yoji Nakajima	Katsuo Ichikawa	Takashi Hidai	Ayako Saitoh	Aki Ogawa	Katsuji Uchibori	WPG 2010 (5th)
2010–11	Katsuo Ichikawa	Kazuyuki Mochiki	Aki Ogawa	Ayako Saitoh	Yoji Nakajima	Teruo Moriizumi	WWhCQ 2010 (4th)
2011–12	Yoji Nakajima	Takashi Sakataya	Hiroshi Wachi	Aki Ogawa	Ayako Saitoh	Michiaki Saito	WWhCQ 2011 (8th)

=== Mixed doubles ===
Season	Female	Male	Coach	Events
2023–24	Aki Ogawa	Yoji Nakajima	Akiko Iino, Eri Ogihara	WWhMDCC 2024 (4th)
2024–25	Aki Ogawa	Yoji Nakajima	Akiko Iino, Eri Ogihara	WWhMDCC 2025 (gold)
