= Angela Menardi =

Italian wheelchair curler and cross-country skier

- Curler ♀
- Born: 4 January 1964 (age 62); Pieve di Cadore

Team
- Curling club: Curling Club 66, Cortina d'Ampezzo

Curling career
- Member Association: Italy
- World Wheelchair Championship: 3 (2012, 2024, 2025)
- Paralympic: 2 (2010, 2026)
Medal record
Wheelchair curling

Angela Menardi (born 4 January 1964 in Pieve di Cadore) is an Italian wheelchair curler and paralympic cross-country skier.

As a wheelchair curler she participated in the 2010 Winter Paralympics where the Italian team finished in fifth place.

As a cross-country skier she participated in the 1992 Winter Paralympics in the women's cross-country short distance 2.5 km LW10-11 and long distance 5 km LW10-11; she finished in seventh place both times.

== Teams ==
Season	Skip	Third	Second	Lead	Alternate	Coach	Events
2009–10	Andrea Tabanelli	Egidio Marchese	Gabriele Dallapiccola	Angela Menardi	Emanuele Spelorzi	Mauro Maino	WPG 2010 (5th)
2010–11	Egidio Marchese	Gabriele Dallapiccola	Angela Menardi	Emanuele Spelorzi	Andrea Tabanelli		WWhCQ 2010 (bronze)
2011–12	Andrea Tabanelli	Egidio Marchese	Emanuele Spelorzi	Angela Menardi	Rosanna Menazzi	Giulo Regli	WWhCQ 2011 (silver); WWhCC 2012 (10th)
2014–15	Egidio Marchese (fourth)	Emanuele Spelorzi (skip)	Sergio Deflorian	Angela Menardi	Rita Dal Monte	Roberto Maino	WWhCQ 2014 (5th)
2018–19	Egidio Marchese (fourth)	Paolo Ioriatti (skip)	Matteo Ronzani	Angela Menardi	Orietta Berto	Sören Gran, Marco Mariani, Gianandrea Gallinatto	WWhBCC 2018 (7th)
2019–20	Egidio Marchese (fourth)	Paolo Ioriatti (skip)	Gabriele Dallapiccola	Angela Menardi	Orietta Berto	Violetta Caldart, Amanda Bianchi	WWhBCC 2019 (5th)
2023–24	Egidio Marchese	Fabrizio Bich	Matteo Ronzani	Angela Menardi	Orietta Berto	Roberto Maino	WWhCC 2024 (8th)
2024–25	Egidio Marchese	Fabrizio Bich	Matteo Ronzani	Angela Menardi	Emanuele Spelorzi	Roberto Maino	WWhCC 2025 (10th)
