= Takashi Hidai =

Japanese wheelchair curler and Paralympian (born 1934)

- Curler ♂
- Born: 24 July 1934 (age 92)

Team
- Curling club: Shinshu Chair Curling Club

Curling career
- Member Association: Japan
- World Wheelchair Championship: 3 (2005, 2007, 2008)
- Paralympic: 1 (2010)
Medal record
Wheelchair curling

Takashi Hidai (born 24 July 1934) is a Japanese wheelchair curler.

He participated in the 2010 Winter Paralympics where the two Japanese teams finished in tenth and fifth places. He participated in the Paralympics at the age of 75, the oldest athlete at that Paralympic tournament.

== Teams ==
Season	Skip	Third	Second	Lead	Alternate	Coach	Events
2004–05	Yoji Nakajima	Katsuo Ichikawa	Takashi Hidai	Ayako Saitoh	Toru Utumi	Kumiko Ogihara	WWhCC 2005 (13th)
2006–07	Yoji Nakajima	Katsuo Ichikawa	Takashi Hidai	Ayako Saitoh	Seiji Uchida	Kumiko Ogihara	WWhCQ 2006 (silver); WWhCC 2007 (5th)
2007–08	Yoji Nakajima	Katsuo Ichikawa	Takashi Hidai	Ayako Saitoh	Mari Yamazaki	Kumiko Ogihara	WWhCC 2008 (9th)
2008–09	Yoji Nakajima	Katsuo Ichikawa	Takashi Hidai	Ayako Saitoh		Emi Kaneko, Satako Ogawa	WWhCQ 2008 (6th)
2009–10	Yoji Nakajima	Katsuo Ichikawa	Takashi Hidai	Ayako Saitoh	Aki Ogawa	Katsuji Uchibori	WPG 2010 (5th)
