= Federica Trota =

Italian wheelchair curler

- Curler ♀

Curling career
- Member Association: Italy
- World Wheelchair Championship: 1 (2002)
Medal record
Wheelchair curling

Federica Trota is an Italian wheelchair curler.

== Teams ==
Season	Skip	Third	Second	Lead	Coach	Events
2001–02	Andrea Tabanelli	Egidio Marchese	Federica Trota	Fabio Tripodi	Mauro Maino	WWhCC 2002 (8th)
