= Cho Yang-hyun =

South Korean wheelchair curler

- Curler ♂
- Born: May 18, 1967 (age 59)

Team
- Curling club: Wonju Yonsei Dream, Gangwon

Curling career
- Member Association: South Korea
- World Wheelchair Championship: 5 (2004, 2005, 2007, 2008, 2009)
- Paralympic: 1 (2010)
Medal record
Wheelchair curling
Winter Paralympics
Silver medal – second place	2010 Vancouver
World Wheelchair Championship
Silver medal – second place	2008 Sursee

Cho Yang-hyun (Korean: 조양현; born May 18, 1967) is a South Korean wheelchair curler and curling coach.

He participated at the 2010 Winter Paralympics where South Korean team won a silver medal. He is a 2008 World wheelchair silver medallist.

== Wheelchair curling teams and events ==
Season	Skip	Third	Second	Lead	Alternate	Coach	Events
2003–04	Kim Hak-sung	Kim Myung-jin	Cho Yae-lee	Cho Yang-hyun	Kim Kab-seung	Yang Se-young	WWhCC 2004 (11th)
2004–05	Kim Hak-sung	Kim Myung-jin	Cho Yang-hyun	Cho Yae-lee	Ham Dong-hee	Kim Chang-gyu	WWhCC 2005 (7th)
2006–07	Kim Hak-sung	Kim Myung-jin	Cho Yang-hyun	Kang Mi-suk	Ham Dong-hee	Kim Chang-gyu	WWhCC 2007 (7th)
2007–08	Kim Hak-sung	Kim Myung-jin	Cho Yang-hyun	Kang Mi-suk	Ham Dong-hee	Kwon Young-il	WWhCC 2008 (silver)
2008–09	Kim Hak-sung	Park Kil-woo	Kim Myung-jin	Cho Yang-hyun	Kang Mi-suk	Hong Jun-pyo	WWhCC 2009 (6th)
2009–10	Kim Hak-sung	Kim Myung-jin	Cho Yang-hyun	Kang Mi-suk	Park Kil-woo	Yang Se-young	WPG 2010 (silver)

== Record as a coach of national teams ==
Year	Tournament, event	National team	Place
2024	2024 World Wheelchair Curling Championship	South Korea (wheelchair)	6
2025	2025 World Wheelchair Curling Championship	South Korea (wheelchair)	2nd place, silver medalist(s)
