= Aki Ogawa =

Japanese wheelchair curler and Paralympian

Aki Ogawa 小川亜希
- Curler ♀
- Born: April 5, 1975 (age 51); Kōnosu, Japan

Team
- Curling club: Shinshu Chair Curling Club

Curling career
- Member Association: Japan
- World Wheelchair Mixed Doubles Championship: 1 (2025)
- Paralympic: 2 (2010, 2026)
Medal record
Wheelchair curling
Representing Japan
World Mixed Doubles Championship
Gold medal – first place	2025 Stevenston

Aki Ogawa (小川 亜希, Ogawa Aki; born April 5, 1975) is a Japanese wheelchair curler. She is a world champion in 2025 together with her partner Yoji Nakajima, becoming the first Japanese world champion in mixed doubles. Previously, she was participated in the 2010 Winter Paralympics where Japanese team finished on fifth place.

== Teams ==
Season	Skip	Third	Second	Lead	Alternate	Coach	Events
2009–10	Yoji Nakajima	Katsuo Ichikawa	Takashi Hidai	Ayako Saitoh	Aki Ogawa	Katsuji Uchibori	WPG 2010 (5th)
2010–11	Katsuo Ichikawa	Kazuyuki Mochiki	Aki Ogawa	Ayako Saitoh	Yoji Nakajima	Teruo Moriizumi	WWhCQ 2010 (4th)
2011–12	Yoji Nakajima	Takashi Sakataya	Hiroshi Wachi	Aki Ogawa	Ayako Saitoh	Michiaki Saito	WWhCQ 2011 (8th)
2012–13	Shiuchi Iijima	Hiroshi Wachi	Sadao Ogawa	Ayako Saitoh	Aki Ogawa	Michiaki Saito	WWhCQ 2012 (8th)

=== Mixed doubles ===
Season	Female	Male	Coach	Events
2023–24	Aki Ogawa	Yoji Nakajima	Akiko Iino, Eri Ogihara	WWhMDCC 2024 (4th)
2024–25	Aki Ogawa	Yoji Nakajima	Akiko Iino, Eri Ogihara	WWhMDCC 2025 (gold)
