= 2007 World Wheelchair Curling Championship – Qualification Event =

2007 World Wheelchair Curling Championship Qualification Event
- Host city: Braehead, Scotland
- Arena: Braehead Curling Rink
- Dates: November 8–12, 2006
- Winners: Russia; Japan
- Skip: Victor Ershov
- Third: Andrey Smirnov
- Second: Oxana Slesarenko
- Lead: Nikolay Melnikov
- Alternate: Valeriy Chepilko
- Coach: Vladimir Zubkov
- Skip: Yoji Nakajima
- Third: Katsuo Ichikawa
- Second: Takashi Hidai
- Lead: Ayako Saitoh
- Alternate: Seiji Uchida
- Coach: Kumiko Ogihara

The qualification event for the 2007 World Wheelchair Curling Championship was held from November 8 to 12, 2006 at the Braehead Curling Rink in Braehead, Scotland. The event's two top finishers, Russia and Japan, both qualified to participate in the 2008 World Wheelchair Curling Championship. The two qualification spots were given to the top two teams at the conclusion of the round robin.

== Teams ==
Bulgaria	Czech Republic	England
Skip: Ivan Shopov Third: Rumen Panayotov; Second: Svetozar Kirov; Lead: Neli Sabeva; Alternate: Petio Zabersky; Coach: Lubomir Velinov	Skip: Radek Musílek Third: Radek Pokorný; Second: Martin Tluk; Lead: Stepan Benes; Alternate: Olga Vikturnova	Skip: Ian Wakenshaw Third: Dave Quarrie; Second: Rosemary Lenton; Lead: Valerie Robertson; Alternate: George Windram; Coach: Joan Reed
Germany	Italy	Japan
Skip: Jens Jäger Third: Jürgen Sommer; Second: Jens Gäbel; Lead: Inge Wenzler; Alternate: Christian Conrad; Coach: Bernd Weisser	Skip: Andrea Tabanelli Third: Egidio Marchese; Second: Emanuele Spelorzi; Lead: Laura Arnanaschi; Alternate: Gabriele Dallapiccola; Coach: Mauro Maino	Skip: Yoji Nakajima Third: Katsuo Ichikawa; Second: Takashi Hidai; Lead: Ayako Saitoh; Alternate: Seiji Uchida; Coach: Kumiko Ogihara
Poland	Russia	Wales
Skip: Eugeniusz Blaszczak Third: Arkadiusz Pawlowski; Second: Ireneusz Jonski; Lead: Magdalena Karlewska; Alternate: Katarzyna Bielawska; Coach: Andrzej Smak	Skip: Victor Ershov Third: Andrey Smirnov; Second: Oxana Slesarenko; Lead: Nikolay Melnikov; Alternate: Valeriy Chepilko; Coach: Vladimir Zubkov	Skip: Mike Preston Third: Clark Shiels; Second: Peter Knapper; Lead: Marion Harrison; Alternate: Allan Young; Coach: John Stone

== Round-robin standings ==
Key
Teams to World Championships

Country	Skip	W	L
Russia	Victor Ershov	6	2
Japan	Yoji Nakajima	6	2
Italy	Andrea Tabanelli	6	2
Czech Republic	Radek Musílek	5	3
England	Ian Wakenshaw	4	4
Poland	Eugeniusz Blaszczak	3	5
Bulgaria	Ivan Shopov	2	6
Germany	Jens Jäger	2	6
Wales	Mike Preston	2	6

== Round-robin results ==
=== Draw 1 ===
Wednesday, November 8, 9:30

Sheet A	1	2	3	4	5	6	Final
Bulgaria (Shopov) 🔨	0	0	1	2	0	0	3
Czech Republic (Musílek)	1	2	0	0	2	2	7

Sheet B	1	2	3	4	5	6	Final
England (Wakenshaw) 🔨	3	1	0	2	0	0	6
Germany (Jäger)	0	0	3	0	3	1	7

Sheet C	1	2	3	4	5	6	Final
Japan (Nakajima) 🔨	0	1	0	1	3	3	8
Italy (Tabanelli)	2	0	3	0	0	0	5

Sheet D	1	2	3	4	5	6	Final
Russia (Ershov) 🔨	1	1	1	2	1	1	7
Poland (Blaszczak)	0	0	0	0	0	0	0

=== Draw 2 ===
Wednesday, November 8, 14:00

Sheet A	1	2	3	4	5	6	Final
Wales (Preston)	1	1	0	3	0	1	6
Poland (Blaszczak) 🔨	0	0	2	0	2	0	4

Sheet B	1	2	3	4	5	6	Final
Japan (Nakajima) 🔨	1	1	0	0	0	0	2
Russia (Ershov)	0	0	2	2	1	2	7

Sheet C	1	2	3	4	5	6	Final
Czech Republic (Musílek) 🔨	3	0	1	1	2	4	11
Germany (Jäger)	0	1	0	0	0	0	1

Sheet D	1	2	3	4	5	6	Final
England (Wakenshaw)	0	0	1	1	4	2	8
Italy (Tabanelli) 🔨	1	2	0	0	0	0	3

=== Draw 3 ===
Thursday, November 9, 9:30

Sheet A	1	2	3	4	5	6	Final
Czech Republic (Musílek) 🔨	0	0	1	0	4	1	6
Italy (Tabanelli)	3	4	0	2	0	0	9

Sheet B	1	2	3	4	5	6	Final
Germany (Jäger) 🔨	0	0	0	0	1	2	3
Poland (Blaszczak)	1	1	2	1	0	0	5

Sheet C	1	2	3	4	5	6	Final
Bulgaria (Shopov)	0	0	0	0	2	1	3
Russia (Ershov) 🔨	1	2	3	1	0	0	7

Sheet D	1	2	3	4	5	6	Final
Japan (Nakajima)	0	0	3	0	1	0	4
Wales (Preston)	3	2	0	2	0	1	8

=== Draw 4 ===
Thursday, November 9, 14:00

Sheet A	1	2	3	4	5	6	Final
England (Wakenshaw) 🔨	0	0	0	0	2	0	2
Russia (Ershov)	1	1	1	1	0	1	5

Sheet B	1	2	3	4	5	6	EE	Final
Bulgaria (Shopov) 🔨	0	1	0	2	3	0	0	6
Japan (Nakajima)	2	0	3	0	0	1	3	9

Sheet C	1	2	3	4	5	6	Final
Germany (Jäger)	0	1	1	2	0	1	5
Wales (Preston) 🔨	1	0	0	0	3	0	4

Sheet D	1	2	3	4	5	6	Final
Czech Republic (Musílek)	5	4	0	1	0	0	10
Poland (Blaszczak) 🔨	0	0	2	0	2	2	6

=== Draw 5 ===
Friday, November 10, 9:30

Sheet A	1	2	3	4	5	6	Final
Germany (Jäger) 🔨	0	2	0	0	1	1	4
Bulgaria (Shopov)	1	0	2	2	0	0	5

Sheet B	1	2	3	4	5	6	Final
Wales (Preston)	0	0	0	1	0	2	3
Czech Republic (Musílek) 🔨	1	2	1	0	3	0	7

Sheet C	1	2	3	4	5	6	Final
England (Wakenshaw)	0	1	0	0	0	0	1
Japan (Nakajima) 🔨	3	0	1	2	2	3	11

Sheet D	1	2	3	4	5	6	EE	Final
Italy (Tabanelli) 🔨	1	0	0	0	2	2	1	6
Russia (Ershov)	0	1	2	2	0	0	0	5

=== Draw 6 ===
Friday, November 10, 14:00

Sheet A	1	2	3	4	5	6	Final
Poland (Blaszczak) 🔨	0	0	1	0	0	0	1
Japan (Nakajima)	1	1	0	6	2	3	13

Sheet B	1	2	3	4	5	6	Final
Russia (Ershov) 🔨	1	0	2	1	0	2	6
Germany (Jäger)	0	1	0	0	1	0	2

Sheet C	1	2	3	4	5	6	Final
Italy (Tabanelli) 🔨	4	2	1	0	3	X	10
Wales (Preston)	0	0	0	1	0	X	1

Sheet D	1	2	3	4	5	6	Final
Bulgaria (Shopov) 🔨	0	1	2	0	0	0	3
England (Wakenshaw)	2	0	0	2	3	1	8

=== Draw 7 ===
Saturday, November 11, 9:30

Sheet A	1	2	3	4	5	6	Final
Russia (Ershov)	1	2	1	1	1	0	6
Wales (Preston) 🔨	0	0	0	0	0	3	3

Sheet B	1	2	3	4	5	6	Final
Italy (Tabanelli) 🔨	0	1	0	0	1	3	5
Bulgaria (Shopov)	1	0	1	1	0	0	3

Sheet C	1	2	3	4	5	6	Final
Poland (Blaszczak)	0	2	0	0	3	1	6
England (Wakenshaw) 🔨	2	0	1	1	0	0	4

Sheet D	1	2	3	4	5	6	Final
Japan (Nakajima) 🔨	3	1	3	0	2	X	9
Czech Republic (Musílek)	0	0	0	1	0	X	1

=== Draw 8 ===
Saturday, November 11, 14:00

Sheet A	1	2	3	4	5	6	Final
Italy (Tabanelli)	0	1	0	1	2	1	5
Germany (Jäger) 🔨	2	0	2	0	0	0	4

Sheet B	1	2	3	4	5	6	Final
Wales (Preston)	0	0	0	0	2	0	2
England (Wakenshaw) 🔨	4	3	2	1	0	1	11

Sheet C	1	2	3	4	5	6	Final
Russia (Ershov) 🔨	0	1	1	0	1	0	3
Czech Republic (Musílek)	3	0	0	1	0	4	8

Sheet D	1	2	3	4	5	6	Final
Poland (Blaszczak)	1	0	3	2	0	2	8
Bulgaria (Shopov) 🔨	0	3	0	0	1	0	4

=== Draw 9 ===
Sunday, November 12, 9:30

Sheet A	1	2	3	4	5	6	Final
Czech Republic (Musílek) 🔨	1	0	3	2	0	2	8
England (Wakenshaw)	0	3	0	0	1	0	4

Sheet B	1	2	3	4	5	6	Final
Poland (Blaszczak) 🔨	3	1	0	1	0	0	5
Italy (Tabanelli)	0	0	5	0	4	1	10

Sheet C	1	2	3	4	5	6	Final
Wales (Preston) 🔨	3	0	0	0	1	0	4
Bulgaria (Shopov)	0	3	3	3	0	1	10

Sheet D	1	2	3	4	5	6	EE	Final
Germany (Jäger) 🔨	0	1	0	1	0	1	0	3
Japan (Nakajima)	1	0	1	0	1	0	1	4

== Tiebreaker ==
Sunday, November 12, 14:00

Sheet B	1	2	3	4	5	6	Final
Italy (Tabanelli) 🔨	0	0	0	1	0	0	1
Japan (Nakajima)	1	1	1	0	3	2	8
