= Ham Dong-hee =

South Korean wheelchair curler

- Curler ♂

Curling career
- Member Association: South Korea
- World Wheelchair Championship: 3 (2005, 2007, 2008)
Medal record
Wheelchair curling
World Wheelchair Championship
Silver medal – second place	2008 Sursee

Ham Dong-hee (Note: Other writings: Dong-hee Ham, Ham Donghee, Donghee Ham, Ham Dong Hee, Dong Hee Ham.)(Korean: 함동희) is a South Korean wheelchair curler.

== Wheelchair curling teams and events ==
Season	Skip	Third	Second	Lead	Alternate	Coach	Events
2004–05	Kim Hak-sung	Kim Myung-jin	Cho Yang-hyun	Cho Yae-lee	Ham Dong-hee	Kim Chang-gyu	WWhCC 2005 (7th)
2006–07	Kim Hak-sung	Kim Myung-jin	Cho Yang-hyun	Kang Mi-suk	Ham Dong-hee	Kim Chang-gyu	WWhCC 2007 (7th)
2007–08	Kim Hak-sung	Kim Myung-jin	Cho Yang-hyun	Kang Mi-suk	Ham Dong-hee	Kwon Young-il	WWhCC 2008 (silver)
