= Wheelchair curling at the 2010 Winter Paralympics =

Coordinates: 49°14′41.5″N 123°6′31.2″W

Wheelchair curling at the X Paralympic Winter Games
- Venue: Vancouver Olympic/Paralympic Centre
- Dates: 13–20 March 2010
- Competitors: 10 teams from 10 nations

Medalists
1st place, gold medalist(s)		Canada
2nd place, silver medalist(s)		South Korea
3rd place, bronze medalist(s)		Sweden

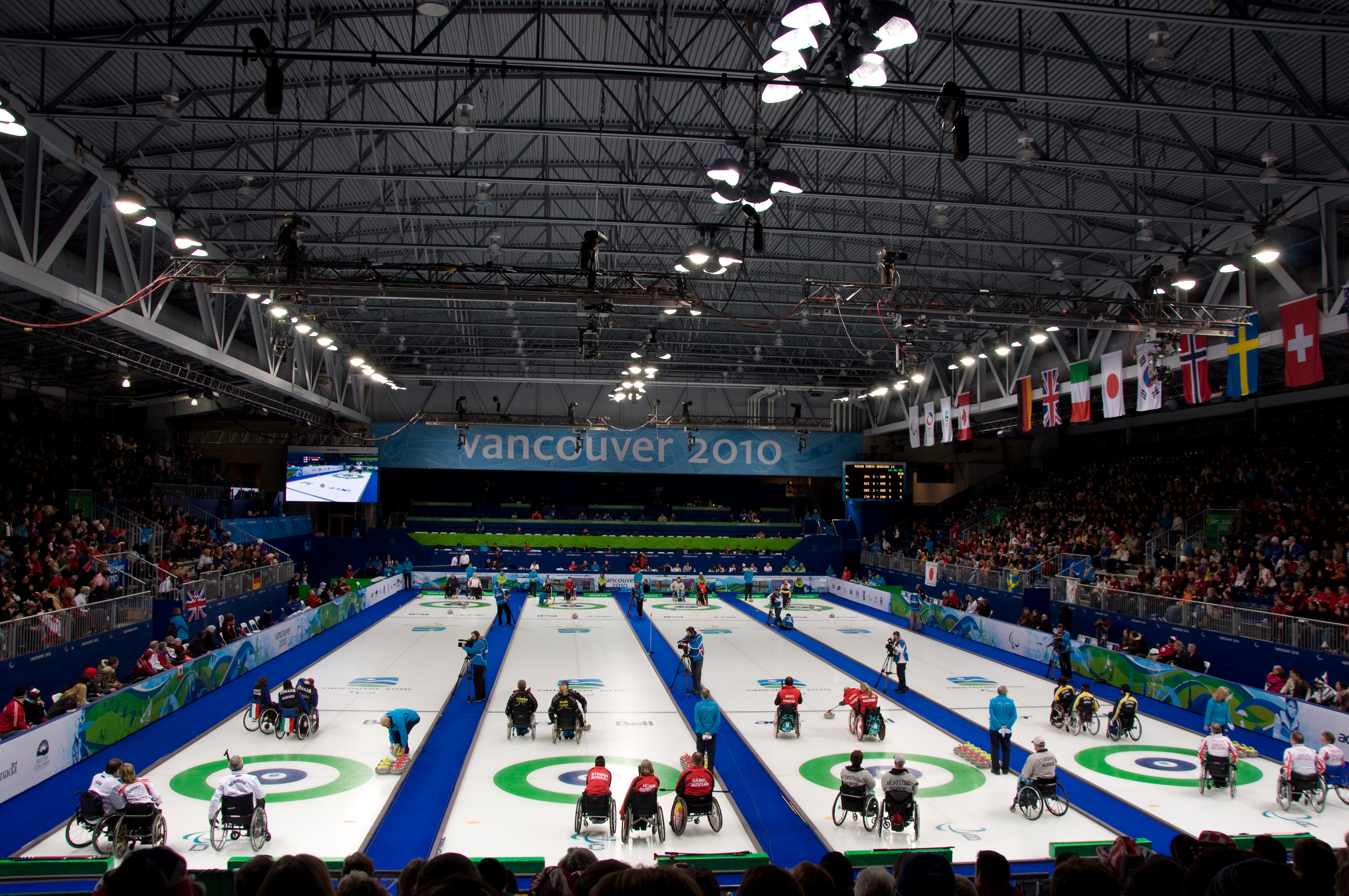
Wheelchair Curling at the Vancouver Olympic/Paralympic Centre, during the 2010 Paralympics.

The wheelchair curling competition of the 2010 Winter Paralympics was held at the Vancouver Olympic/Paralympic Centre in Vancouver, British Columbia, Canada, from 13 March to 20 March 2010. Ten teams competed in a single event, a mixed tournament in which men and women competed together.

== Medal summary ==
=== Medal table ===
Rank	Nation	Gold	Silver	Bronze	Total
1	Canada (CAN)	1	0	0	1
2	South Korea (KOR)	0	1	0	1
3	Sweden (SWE)	0	0	1	1
Totals (3 entries)		1	1	1	3

=== Events ===
Event	Gold	Silver	Bronze
Mixed	Canada (CAN); Jim Armstrong; Darryl Neighbour; Ina Forrest; Sonja Gaudet; Bruno Yizek (alternate); Coach: Joe Rea	South Korea (KOR); Kim Hak-sung; Kim Myung-jin; Kang Mi-suk; Park Kil-woo; Cho Yang-hyun (alternate); Coach: Yang Se-young	Sweden (SWE); Jalle Jungnell; Glenn Ikonen*; Patrik Burman; Anette Wilhelm; Patrik Kallin (alternate); Coach: Tomas Nordin

* suspended

== Teams ==
Each team consists of five curlers and must include at least one person from each gender.

Team	Roster					
Team	Skip	Third	Second	Lead	Alternate	Coach
Canada (CAN)	Jim Armstrong	Darryl Neighbour	Ina Forrest	Sonja Gaudet	Bruno Yizek	Joe Rea
Germany (GER)	Jens Jaeger	Marcus Sieger	Jens Gaebel	Christiane Steger	Astrid Hoer	Helmar Erlewein
Great Britain (GBR)	Michael McCreadie	Aileen Neilson	Tom Killin	Angie Malone	Jim Sellar	Tom Pendreigh
Italy (ITA)	Andrea Tabanelli	Egidio Marchese	Gabriele Dallapiccola	Angela Menardi	Emanuele Spelorzi	Mauro Maino
Japan (JPN)	Yoji Nakajima	Katsuo Ichikawa	Takashi Hidai	Ayako Saitoh	Aki Ogawa	Katsuji Uchibori
Norway (NOR)	Rune Lorentzen	Jostein Stordahl	Geir Arne Skogstad	Lene Tystad	Anne Mette Samdal	Per Christensen
South Korea (KOR)	Kim Hak-sung	Kim Myung-jin	Cho Yang-hyun	Kang Mi-suk	Park Kil-woo	Yang Se-young
Sweden (SWE)	Jalle Jungnell	Glenn Ikonen	Patrik Burman	Anette Wilhelm	Patrik Kallin	Tomas Nordin
Switzerland (SUI)	Manfred Bolliger	Claudia Hüttenmoser	Daniel Meyer	Anton Kehrli	Martin Bieri	Nadia Röthlisberger
United States (USA)	Augusto Perez	Patrick McDonald	James Pierce	Jacqui Kapinowski	James Joseph	Steve Brown

== Qualification ==
Qualification for the 2010 Paralympics was based on rankings in the 2007, 2008, and 2009 World Wheelchair Curling Championships. Points were awarded for a top-ten finish in these three competitions, with twelve points given for taking first place and one point for tenth place. The nine countries with the most points were to qualify for the Vancouver Games, while the tenth slot was reserved for the host country, Canada. Because the Canadian team placed within the top nine point-scorers, the tenth slot was given to the tenth-ranked team, Japan.

Key
Host nation (automatic qualification)

Rank	IPC	2007	2008	2009	Total
1	Norway	12	12	4	28
2	Canada	7	7	12	26
3	United States	5.5	8	7	20.5
4	South Korea	4	10	5	19
5	Great Britain^{1}	8	4	6	18
6	Sweden	1	5	10	16
7	Switzerland	10	3	1	14
8	Germany	0	0	8	8
9	Italy	0	6	2	8
10	Japan	5.5	2	0	7.5

Notes

1. England, Scotland, and Wales compete separately at the World Wheelchair Curling Championships but compete together as "Great Britain" at the Paralympics. Under an agreement between the curling federations in these three areas, only points earned by the Scottish team counted towards Great Britain's Paralympic qualifying total.

== Standings ==
Pos	Team	Pld	W	L	PF	PA	PD	Pts	Qualification	Canada	United States	South Korea	Italy	Sweden	Great Britain	Switzerland	Germany	Norway	Japan
1	Canada	9	7	2	78	41	+37	16	Advance to Playoffs	—	10–5	6–4	7–8	4–8	9–2	15–1	8–6	6–5	13–2
2	United States	9	7	2	65	49	+16	16	Advance to Playoffs	5–10	—	9–6	8–2	4–6	8–7	8–2	6–5	9–8	8–3
3	South Korea	9	6	3	65	45	+20	15	Advance to Playoffs	4–6	6–9	—	9–3	8–4	7–5	9–3	9–2	6–9	7–4
4	Italy	9	5	4	62	55	+7	14	Advance to tiebreaker	8–7	2–8	3–9	—	9–1	6–3	13–4	6–7	9–7	6–9
5	Sweden	9	5	4	55	53	+2	14	Advance to tiebreaker	8–4	6–4	4–8	1–9	—	7–6	6–7	10–3	6–4	7–8
6	Great Britain	9	3	6	56	52	+4	12		2–9	7–8	4–7	3–6	6–7	—	10–2	9–2	5–7	10–4
7	Switzerland	9	3	6	43	74	−31	12		1–15	2–8	3–9	4–13	7–6	2–10	—	9–3	10–4	5–6
8	Germany	9	3	6	50	67	−17	12		6–8	5–6	2–9	7–6	3–10	2–9	3–9	—	10–6	12–4
9	Norway	9	3	6	61	64	−3	12		5–6	8–9	9–6	7–9	4–6	7–5	4–10	6–10	—	11–3
10	Japan	9	3	6	44	79	−35	12		2–13	3–8	5–7	9–6	8–7	4–10	6–5	4–12	3–11	—

== Playoffs ==
Semifinals
1	Canada	10
4	Sweden	5
3	United States	5
2	South Korea	7

Finals
1	Canada	8
3	South Korea	7
Third place
4	Sweden	7
2	United States	5

== Sessions ==
All times are local (UTC−8).

=== Session 1 ===
13 March 2010, 12:30

Draw 1 - Sheet A	1	2	3	4	5	6	7	8	Final
South Korea (Kim)	0	0	3	0	3	0	0	0	6
United States (Perez) 🔨	1	1	0	2	0	2	2	1	9

Draw 1 - Sheet B	1	2	3	4	5	6	7	8	Final
Great Britain (McCreadie)	1	0	0	0	0	1	0	X	2
Canada (Armstrong) 🔨	0	2	1	3	2	0	1	X	9

Draw 1 - Sheet C	1	2	3	4	5	6	7	8	Final
Sweden (Jungnell)	0	0	2	0	3	0	1	0	6
Switzerland (Bolliger) 🔨	1	1	0	1	0	2	0	2	7

Draw 1 - Sheet D	1	2	3	4	5	6	7	8	Final
Germany (Jaeger) 🔨	0	1	0	0	3	0	6	X	10
Norway (Lorentzen)	1	0	2	1	0	2	0	X	6

=== Session 2 ===
13 March 2010, 18:00

Draw 2 - Sheet A	1	2	3	4	5	6	7	8	Final
Italy (Tabanelli)	3	0	0	0	1	0	2	0	6
Japan (Nakajima) 🔨	0	1	3	2	0	2	0	1	9

Draw 2 - Sheet B	1	2	3	4	5	6	7	8	Final
Sweden (Jungnell)	0	1	2	0	1	0	0	0	4
South Korea (Kim) 🔨	2	0	0	1	0	2	1	2	8

Draw 2 - Sheet C	1	2	3	4	5	6	7	8	Final
Norway (Lorentzen)	0	0	2	1	2	0	0	2	7
Great Britain (McCreadie) 🔨	2	1	0	0	0	1	1	0	5

Draw 2 - Sheet D	1	2	3	4	5	6	7	8	Final
Canada (Armstrong)	0	4	2	2	0	2	0	X	10
United States (Perez) 🔨	2	0	0	0	1	0	2	X	5

=== Session 3 ===
14 March 2010, 12:30

Draw 3 - Sheet A	1	2	3	4	5	6	7	8	Final
Norway (Lorentzen) 🔨	1	1	1	0	0	2	0	0	5
Canada (Armstrong)	0	0	0	2	1	0	1	2	6

Draw 3 - Sheet B	1	2	3	4	5	6	7	8	Final
Italy (Tabanelli)	1	5	3	1	0	3	X	X	13
Switzerland (Bolliger) 🔨	0	0	0	0	4	0	X	X	4

Draw 3 - Sheet C	1	2	3	4	5	6	7	8	Final
United States (Perez) 🔨	0	0	2	1	0	1	1	1	6
Germany (Jaeger)	1	3	0	0	1	0	0	0	5

Draw 3 - Sheet D	1	2	3	4	5	6	7	8	Final
Japan (Nakajima) 🔨	1	0	1	0	0	3	0	X	5
South Korea (Kim)	0	1	0	2	2	0	2	X	7

=== Session 4 ===
14 March 2010, 18:00

Draw 4 - Sheet A	1	2	3	4	5	6	7	8	Final
Sweden (Jungnell) 🔨	0	0	0	0	0	1	0	X	1
Italy (Tabanelli)	1	1	1	2	3	0	1	X	9

Draw 4 - Sheet C	1	2	3	4	5	6	7	8	Final
Japan (Nakajima) 🔨	0	0	0	1	0	3	0	X	4
Germany (Jaeger)	3	1	3	0	3	0	2	X	12

Draw 4 - Sheet D	1	2	3	4	5	6	7	8	Final
Switzerland (Bolliger) 🔨	0	0	2	0	0	0	0	X	2
Great Britain (McCreadie)	1	1	0	1	4	2	1	X	10

=== Session 5 ===
15 March 2010, 12:30

Draw 5 - Sheet A	1	2	3	4	5	6	7	8	Final
Great Britain (McCreadie)	0	0	0	0	1	1	2	X	4
South Korea (Kim) 🔨	2	2	2	1	0	0	0	X	7

Draw 5 - Sheet B	1	2	3	4	5	6	7	8	Final
Norway (Lorentzen) 🔨	0	1	0	1	0	0	1	1	4
Sweden (Jungnell)	1	0	1	0	0	4	0	0	6

Draw 5 - Sheet C	1	2	3	4	5	6	7	8	Final
Japan (Nakajima) 🔨	0	0	0	1	0	1	0	X	2
Canada (Armstrong)	3	1	2	0	2	0	5	X	13

Draw 5 - Sheet D	1	2	3	4	5	6	7	8	Final
United States (Perez) 🔨	2	0	2	2	0	1	0	1	8
Italy (Tabanelli)	0	1	0	0	0	0	1	0	2

=== Session 6 ===
15 March 2010, 18:00

Draw 6 - Sheet A	1	2	3	4	5	6	7	8	Final
Germany (Jaeger) 🔨	1	0	1	0	0	1	0	0	3
Switzerland (Bolliger)	0	1	0	1	1	0	3	3	9

Draw 6 - Sheet B	1	2	3	4	5	6	7	8	EE	Final
Great Britain (McCreadie)	0	0	0	2	0	2	0	3	0	7
United States (Perez) 🔨	1	1	3	0	1	0	1	0	1	8

Draw 6 - Sheet C	1	2	3	4	5	6	7	8	Final
South Korea (Kim)	0	0	0	1	0	3	2	0	6
Norway (Lorentzen) 🔨	3	3	1	0	1	0	0	1	9

Draw 6 - Sheet D	1	2	3	4	5	6	7	8	Final
Sweden (Jungnell)	2	0	0	2	3	1	0	X	8
Canada (Armstrong) 🔨	0	2	1	0	0	0	1	X	4

=== Session 7 ===
16 March 2010, 12:30

Draw 7 - Sheet B	1	2	3	4	5	6	7	8	Final
Canada (Armstrong)	1	0	2	5	1	6	X	X	15
Switzerland (Bolliger) 🔨	0	1	0	0	0	0	X	X	1

Draw 7 - Sheet C	1	2	3	4	5	6	7	8	Final
Italy (Tabanelli)	0	3	1	0	0	2	0	0	6
Germany (Jaeger) 🔨	2	0	0	2	1	0	1	1	7

Draw 7 - Sheet D	1	2	3	4	5	6	7	8	Final
Norway (Lorentzen) 🔨	2	3	1	3	0	2	0	X	11
Japan (Nakajima)	0	0	0	0	2	0	1	X	3

=== Session 8 ===
16 March 2010, 18:00

Draw 8 - Sheet A	1	2	3	4	5	6	7	8	Final
United States (Perez) 🔨	0	2	0	1	0	1	0	X	4
Sweden (Jungnell)	2	0	1	0	1	0	2	X	6

Draw 8 - Sheet B	1	2	3	4	5	6	7	8	Final
South Korea (Kim) 🔨	3	2	0	0	3	0	1	X	9
Italy (Tabanelli)	0	0	1	1	0	1	0	X	3

Draw 8 - Sheet C	1	2	3	4	5	6	7	8	EE	Final
Switzerland (Bolliger) 🔨	1	1	1	0	0	0	2	0	0	5
Japan (Nakajima)	0	0	0	1	1	2	0	1	1	6

Draw 8 - Sheet D	1	2	3	4	5	6	7	8	Final
Great Britain (McCreadie) 🔨	0	2	0	3	0	4	X	X	9
Germany (Jaeger)	0	0	1	0	1	0	X	X	2

=== Session 9 ===
17 March 2010, 12:30

Draw 9 - Sheet A	1	2	3	4	5	6	7	8	Final
Canada (Armstrong)	0	2	4	0	1	1	0	0	8
Germany (Jaeger) 🔨	1	0	0	1	0	0	3	1	6

Draw 9 - Sheet B	1	2	3	4	5	6	7	8	EE	Final
Sweden (Jungnell) 🔨	0	0	1	0	0	0	3	2	1	7
Great Britain (McCreadie)	1	1	0	0	1	3	0	0	0	6

Draw 9 - Sheet C	1	2	3	4	5	6	7	8	Final
Norway (Lorentzen)	0	0	3	0	0	3	0	2	8
United States (Perez) 🔨	2	1	0	3	2	0	1	0	9

Draw 9 - Sheet D	1	2	3	4	5	6	7	8	Final
South Korea (Kim)	2	0	3	0	1	3	0	X	9
Switzerland (Bolliger) 🔨	0	1	0	1	0	0	1	X	3

=== Session 10 ===
17 March 2010, 18:00

Draw 10 - Sheet A	1	2	3	4	5	6	7	8	Final
Italy (Tabanelli) 🔨	1	0	3	1	0	2	0	2	9
Norway (Lorentzen)	0	1	0	0	1	0	5	0	7

Draw 10 - Sheet B	1	2	3	4	5	6	7	8	Final
United States (Perez) 🔨	0	6	0	0	0	1	1	X	8
Japan (Nakajima)	1	0	1	0	1	0	0	X	3

Draw 10 - Sheet C	1	2	3	4	5	6	7	8	Final
Canada (Armstrong) 🔨	1	1	0	1	0	2	0	1	6
South Korea (Kim)	0	0	1	0	2	0	1	0	4

=== Session 11 ===
18 March 2010, 12:30

Draw 11 - Sheet A	1	2	3	4	5	6	7	8	Final
Switzerland (Bolliger)	0	0	0	1	0	1	0	X	2
United States (Perez) 🔨	2	1	1	0	3	0	1	X	8

Draw 11 - Sheet B	1	2	3	4	5	6	7	8	Final
Germany (Jaeger) 🔨	0	0	0	0	2	0	0	X	2
South Korea (Kim)	2	2	1	1	0	2	1	X	9

Draw 11 - Sheet C	1	2	3	4	5	6	7	8	Final
Great Britain (McCreadie) 🔨	0	1	0	0	1	0	1	X	3
Italy (Tabanelli)	3	0	1	1	0	1	0	X	6

Draw 11 - Sheet D	1	2	3	4	5	6	7	8	Final
Japan (Nakajima) 🔨	1	1	0	0	4	0	0	2	8
Sweden (Jungnell)	0	0	2	2	0	2	1	0	7

=== Session 12 ===
18 March 2010, 18:00

Draw 12 - Sheet A	1	2	3	4	5	6	7	8	Final
Japan (Nakajima)	0	0	0	0	3	0	1	X	4
Great Britain (McCreadie) 🔨	2	1	1	2	0	4	0	X	10

Draw 12 - Sheet B	1	2	3	4	5	6	7	8	Final
Switzerland (Bolliger) 🔨	0	3	1	2	3	0	1	X	10
Norway (Lorentzen)	1	0	0	0	0	3	0	X	4

Draw 12 - Sheet C	1	2	3	4	5	6	7	8	Final
Germany (Jaeger)	0	0	1	0	1	0	1	X	3
Sweden (Jungnell) 🔨	2	1	0	2	0	5	0	X	10

Draw 12 - Sheet D	1	2	3	4	5	6	7	8	Final
Italy (Tabanelli)	1	0	2	0	0	4	0	1	8
Canada (Armstrong) 🔨	0	1	0	2	2	0	2	0	7

=== Tie-breaker Session 1 ===
19 March 2010, 14:30

Sheet B	1	2	3	4	5	6	7	8	Final
Italy (Tabanelli) 🔨	3	0	1	0	0	1	0	0	5
Sweden (Jungnell)	0	1	0	1	1	0	1	2	6

=== Semifinals ===
20 March 2010, 10:00

Sheet A	1	2	3	4	5	6	7	8	Final
Sweden (Jungnell)	0	1	0	0	3	1	0	X	5
Canada (Armstrong) 🔨	3	0	2	3	0	0	2	X	10

Sheet C	1	2	3	4	5	6	7	8	Final
United States (Perez) 🔨	2	0	2	0	0	0	1	0	5
South Korea (Kim)	0	1	0	3	1	1	0	1	7

=== Bronze Medal Game ===
20 March 2010, 15:30

Sheet D	1	2	3	4	5	6	7	8	Final
United States (Perez) 🔨	0	1	0	3	0	0	1	0	5
(bronze) Sweden (Jungnell)	3	0	1	0	1	1	0	1	7

=== Gold Medal Game ===
20 March 2010, 15:30

Sheet B	1	2	3	4	5	6	7	8	Final
(gold) Canada (Armstrong) 🔨	3	1	0	4	0	0	0	0	8
(silver) South Korea (Kim)	0	0	1	0	2	2	1	1	7

== See also ==
- Curling at the 2010 Winter Olympics
