= Park Kil-woo =

South Korean wheelchair curler (born 1967)

- Curler ♂
- Born: January 4, 1967 (age 59)

Team
- Curling club: Wonju Yonsei Dream, Gangwon

Curling career
- Member Association: South Korea
- World Wheelchair Championship: 2 (2009, 2020)
- Paralympic: 1 (2010)
Medal record
Wheelchair curling
Winter Paralympics
Silver medal – second place	2010 Vancouver

Park Kil-woo(Korean: 박길우; born January 4, 1967) is a South Korean wheelchair curler and curling coach.

He participated at the 2010 Winter Paralympics where South Korean team won a silver medal.

== Wheelchair curling teams and events ==
Season	Skip	Third	Second	Lead	Alternate	Coach	Events
2008–09	Kim Hak-sung	Park Kil-woo	Kim Myung-jin	Cho Yang-hyun	Kang Mi-suk	Hong Jun-pyo	WWhCC 2009 (6th)
2009–10	Kim Hak-sung	Kim Myung-jin	Cho Yang-hyun	Kang Mi-suk	Park Kil-woo	Yang Se-young	WPG 2010 (silver)
2019–20	Yang Hui-tae (fourth)	Jung Seung-won (skip)	Park Kil-woo	Bang Min-ja	Min Byeong-seok	Kim Joung-yil, Yoon So-min	WWhCC 2020 (6th)

== Record as a coach of national teams ==
Year	Tournament, event	National team	Place
2022	2022 World Wheelchair Mixed Doubles Curling Championship	South Korea (wheelchair mixed double)	8
