= Andrea Tabanelli =

Andrea Tabanelli may refer to:

- Andrea Tabanelli (curler) (1961–2020), Italian wheelchair curler
- Andrea Tabanelli (footballer) (born 1990), Italian footballer
