= Toru Utumi =

Japanese wheelchair curler

- Curler ♂

Curling career
- Member Association: Japan
- World Wheelchair Championship: 1 (2005)
Medal record
Wheelchair curling

Toru Utumi is a Japanese wheelchair curler.

== Teams ==
Season	Skip	Third	Second	Lead	Alternate	Coach	Events
2004–05	Yoji Nakajima	Katsuo Ichikawa	Takashi Hidai	Ayako Saitoh	Toru Utumi	Kumiko Ogihara	WWhCC 2005 (13th)
