= Rita Dal Monte =

Italian wheelchair curler and Paralympian

- Curler ♀
- Born: 15 October 1961 (age 65)

Curling career
- Member Association: Italy
- World Wheelchair Championship: 1 (2004)
- Paralympic: 1 (2006)
Medal record
Wheelchair curling

Rita Dal Monte (born 15 October 1961) is an Italian wheelchair curler.

She participated in the 2006 Winter Paralympics where Italian team finished on seventh place.

== Teams ==
| Season | Skip | Third | Second | Lead | Alternate | Coach | Events |
|---|---|---|---|---|---|---|---|
| 2003–04 | Egidio Marchese | Orazio Fagone | Rita Dal Monte | Fabio Tripodi | Pierino Gaspard | Mauro Maino | WWhCC 2004 (6th) |
| 2005–06 | Egidio Marchese | Andrea Tabanelli | Pierino Gaspard | Rita Dal Monte | Emanuele Spelorzi | | WPG 2006 (7th) |
| 2014–15 | Egidio Marchese (fourth) | Emanuele Spelorzi (skip) | Sergio Deflorian | Angela Menardi | Rita Dal Monte | Roberto Maino | WWhCQ 2014 (5th) |
| 2016–17 | Andrea Tabanelli | Egidio Marchese | Emanuele Spelorzi | Rita Dal Monte | Giovanni Fabrizio Ferrero | Roberto Maino | WWhBCC 2016 (14th) |
