= Aosta Valley Airport =

Airport located in Saint-Christophe Aosta, Aosta Valley, Italy

Aosta Valley Airport Aeroporto della Valle d'Aosta
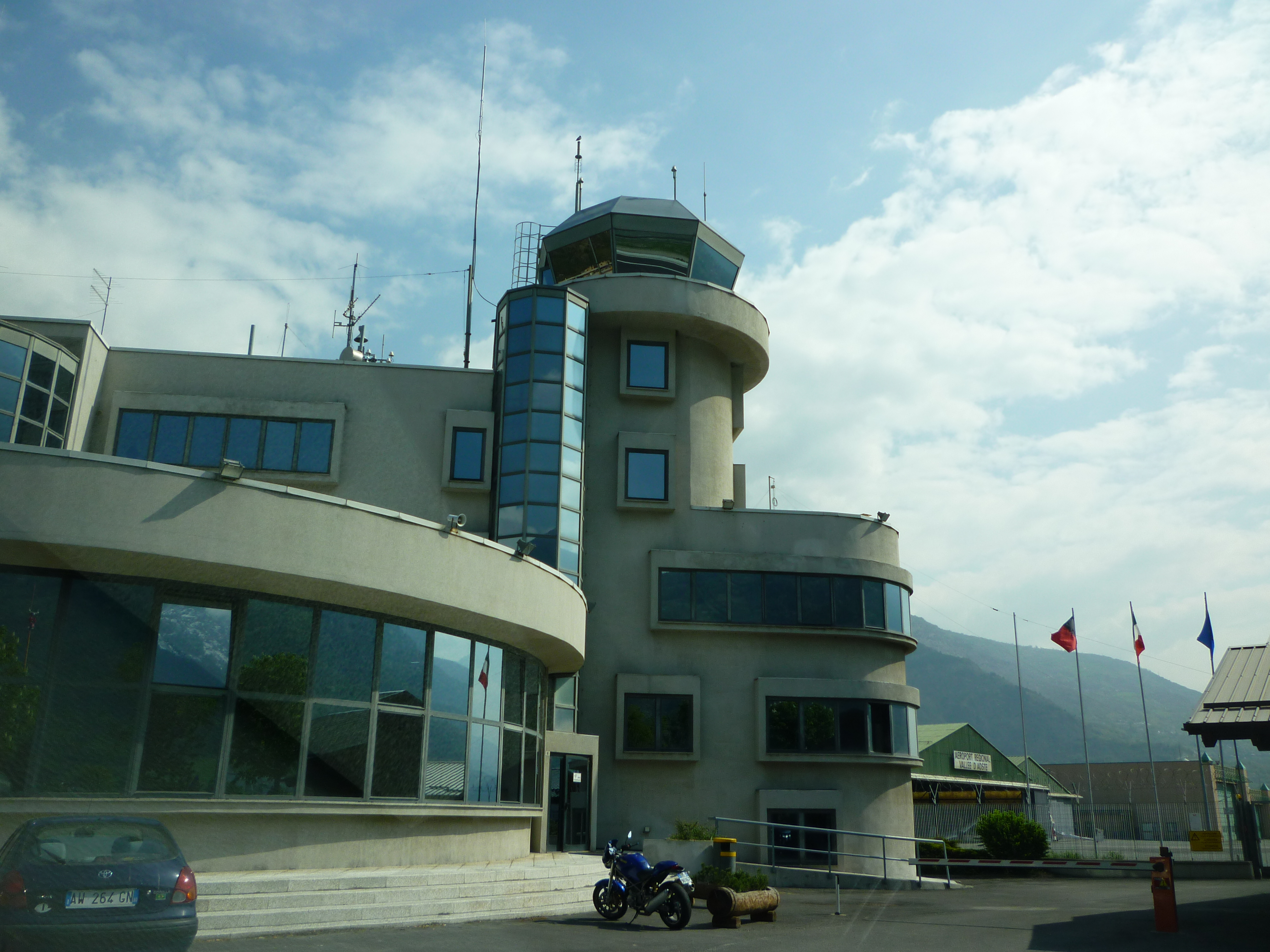
- IATA: AOT; ICAO: LIMW

Summary
- Airport type: Public
- Serves: Aosta, Italy
- Location: Saint-Christophe, Italy
- Time zone: CET (+1)
  - Summer (DST): CEST (+2)
- Elevation AMSL: 546 m / 1,791 ft
- Coordinates: 45°44′18″N 007°22′07″E
- Website: www.avda-aosta.it

Map
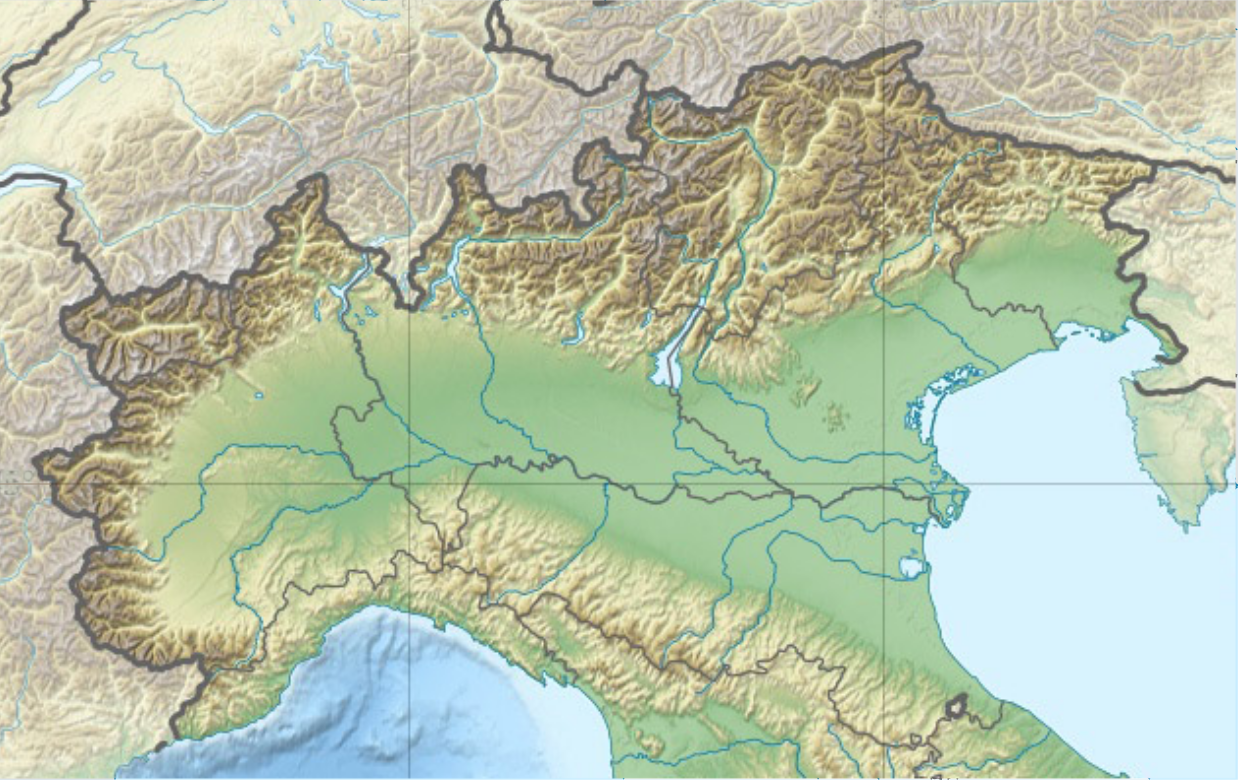

Runways
Direction	Length		Surface
Direction	m	ft	Surface
09/27	1,499	4,916	Asphalt
- Sources: airport web site and DAFIF

Aosta Valley Airport (Italian: Aeroporto della Valle d'Aosta, French: Aéroport de la Vallée d'Aoste) (IATA: AOT, ICAO: LIMW) is an airport located in Les Îles, Saint-Christophe, serving the Aosta Valley region of Italy.

Air Vallée previously had its head office on the property of Aosta Airport. The largest aircraft that has operated at the airport was a BAe 146 operated by Malmo Aviation, but the Boeing 737 and Airbus A318 could possibly also land there too.

== Airlines and destinations ==
The following airlines operate regular scheduled services at Salerno:

Airlines	Destinations
Luxwing	Seasonal charter: Cagliari, Palermo

== See also ==
- List of airports in Italy
