= Patrik Burman =

Swedish wheelchair curler (born 1968)

- Curler ♂
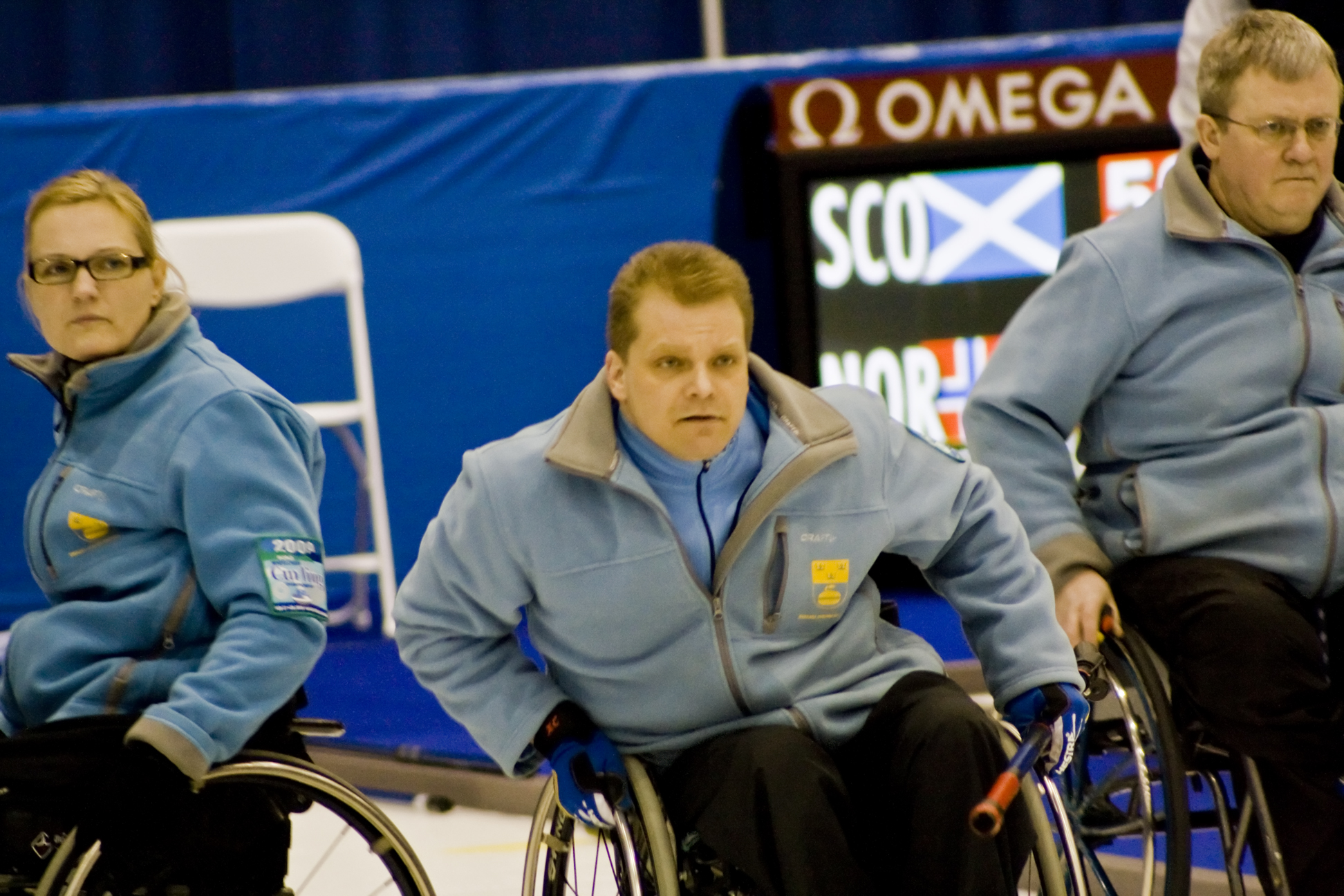
- Born: April 20, 1968 (age 58)

Team
- Curling club: Härnösands CK, Härnösand, Södertälje CK

Curling career
- Member Association: Sweden
- World Wheelchair Championship: 2 (2009, 2011)
- Paralympic: 1 (2010)
Medal record
Wheelchair curling
Winter Paralympics
Bronze medal – third place	2010 Vancouver
World Wheelchair Championship
Silver medal – second place	2009 Vancouver

Ulf Patrik Burman (born April 20, 1968) is a Swedish wheelchair curler.

He participated in the 2010 Winter Paralympics, where Sweden won a bronze medal.

== Wheelchair curling teams and events ==
Season	Skip	Third	Second	Lead	Alternate	Coach	Events
2008–09	Jalle Jungnell	Glenn Ikonen	Patrik Burman	Anette Wilhelm		Thomas Wilhelm, Patrik Kihlström	WWhCC 2009 (silver)
2009–10	Jalle Jungnell	Glenn Ikonen	Patrik Burman	Anette Wilhelm	Patrik Kallin	Tomas Nordin	WPG 2010 (bronze)
2010–11	Glenn Ikonen	Patrik Burman	Patrik Kallin	Kristina Ulander	Gert Erlandsson	Jalle Jungnell	WWhCC 2011 (8th)
