= 2025 World Wheelchair Mixed Doubles Curling Championship =

- Host city: Stevenston, Scotland
- Arena: Auchenharvie Leisure Centre
- Dates: March 11–16
- Winner: Japan
- Female: Aki Ogawa
- Male: Yoji Nakajima
- Finalist: Scotland (Charlotte McKenna / Hugh Nibloe)

The 2025 World Wheelchair Mixed Doubles Curling Championship was held from March 11 to 16 at the Auchenharvie Leisure Centre in Stevenston, Scotland.

The format of the championship will be held in a round robin format with three groups, the top two teams in each group, plus the two third-ranked teams with the better draw shot challenge (DSC), will qualify for the quarter-finals. Teams will be ranked 1 to 8 by comparing the DSCs of the teams with the same rank from each group. This event is the last event to earn Qualification Points for the 2026 Winter Paralympics.

== Teams ==
The teams are listed as follows:

Brazil	Canada	China	Czech Republic
Female: Vilma Miranda; Male: Jerônimo Gabriel	Female: Ina Forrest; Male: Mark Ideson	Female: Wang Meng; Male: Yang Jinqiao	Female: Zaneta Schmuttermeierova; Male: Radek Musilek
Denmark	England	Estonia	Finland
Female: Helle Christiansen-Schmidt; Male: Kenneth Ørbæk	Female: Karen Aspey; Male: Stewart Pimblett	Female: Katlin Riidebach; Male: Ain Villau	Female: Ritva Lampinen; Male: Harri Tuomaala
Hungary	Italy	Japan	Latvia
Female: Aniko Sasadi; Male: Peter Barkoczi	Female: Orietta Berto; Male: Paolo Ioriatti	Female: Aki Ogawa; Male: Yoji Nakajima	Female: Poļina Rožkova; Male: Agris Lasmans
Norway	Poland	Scotland	Slovakia
Female: Mia Sveberg; Male: Geir Skogstad	Female: Joanna Kozakiewicz; Male: Michal Gasik-Daszkowski	Female: Charlotte McKenna; Male: Hugh Nibloe	Female: Monika Kunkelová; Male: Radoslav Ďuriš
South Korea	Spain	Switzerland	Turkey
Female: Kim Hye-min; Male: Jeong Jun-ho	Female: Anna Rodriguez; Male: Bertrand Tramont	Female: Fanny Jaquerod; Male: Eric Décorvet	Female: Zuleyha Bingol; Male: Mesut Gules
United States			
Female: Laura Dwyer; Male: Stephen Emt			

== Round robin standings ==
Final Round Robin Standings

Key
Teams to Playoffs

Group A	Athletes	W	L	W–L	PF	PA	EW	EL	BE	SE	DSC
Norway	Mia Sveberg / Geir Skogstad	5	1	–	52	36	24	19	0	9	89.62
Japan	Aki Ogawa / Yoji Nakajima	4	2	2–0	52	43	26	21	0	11	150.75
United States	Laura Dwyer / Stephen Emt	4	2	1–1	49	41	28	17	0	14	119.21
China	Wang Meng / Yang Jinqiao	4	2	0–2	49	26	25	19	0	10	82.01
Switzerland	Fanny Jaquerod / Eric Décorvet	2	4	–	33	43	21	25	0	8	125.49
Finland	Ritva Lampinen / Harri Tuomaala	1	5	1–0	23	51	14	28	1	4	126.49
Brazil	Vilma Miranda / Jerônimo Gabriel	1	5	0–1	30	58	18	27	0	5	124.57

Group B	Athletes	W	L	W–L	PF	PA	EW	EL	BE	SE	DSC
Canada	Ina Forrest / Mark Ideson	6	0	–	60	21	25	17	0	12	92.42
Czech Republic	Zaneta Schmuttermeierova / Radek Musilek	4	2	–	40	40	25	24	0	8	97.19
Estonia	Katlin Riidebach / Ain Villau	3	3	1–0	40	45	24	22	0	11	101.50
Latvia	Poļina Rožkova / Agris Lasmans	3	3	0–1	42	33	25	18	0	11	111.37
Denmark	Helle Christiansen-Schmidt / Kenneth Ørbæk	2	4	1–0	39	45	23	25	0	7	126.03
Italy	Orietta Berto / Paolo Ioriatti	2	4	0–1	39	47	20	26	0	7	120.87
Poland	Joanna Kozakiewicz / Michal Gasik-Daszkowski	1	5	–	31	60	17	27	0	3	98.78

Group C	Athletes	W	L	W–L	PF	PA	EW	EL	BE	SE	DSC
South Korea	Kim Hye-min / Jeong Jun-ho	6	0	–	52	29	27	18	0	11	53.99
Scotland	Charlotte McKenna / Hugh Nibloe	4	2	1–0	44	33	26	17	0	12	107.99
Slovakia	Monika Kunkelová / Radoslav Ďuriš	4	2	0–1	44	34	24	24	0	10	116.09
England	Karen Aspey / Stewart Pimblett	3	3	–	45	47	22	23	0	8	132.67
Hungary	Aniko Sasadi / Peter Barkoczi	2	4	–	37	39	22	24	0	7	104.94
Turkey	Zuleyha Bingol / Mesut Gules	1	5	1–0	31	45	21	23	0	5	132.01
Spain	Anna Rodriguez / Bertrand Tramont	1	5	0–1	27	53	16	29	0	5	136.00

Group A Round Robin Summary Table
Pos.	Country	Brazil	China	Finland	Japan	Norway	Switzerland	United States	Record
7	Brazil	—	1–14	5–6	13–11	3–10	5–8	3–9	1–5
4	China	14–1	—	7–3	5–6	11–4	6–3	6–9	4–2
6	Finland	6–5	3–7	—	3–11	3–9	6–9	2–10	1–5
2	Japan	11–13	6–5	11–3	—	8–9	8–6	8–7	4–2
1	Norway	10–3	4–11	9–3	9–8	—	11–4	9–7	5–1
5	Switzerland	8–5	3–6	9–6	6–8	4–11	—	3–7	2–4
3	United States	9–3	9–6	10–2	7–8	7–9	7–3	—	4–2

Group B Round Robin Summary Table
Pos.	Country	Canada	Czech Republic	Denmark	Estonia	Italy	Latvia	Poland	Record
1	Canada	—	10–5	9–4	14–3	7–5	9–3	11–1	6–0
2	Czech Republic	5–10	—	6–5	7–3	5–9	8–6	9–7	4–2
5	Denmark	4–9	5–6	—	7–12	7–5	5–8	11–5	2–4
3	Estonia	3–14	3–7	12–7	—	6–8	8–3	8–6	3–3
6	Italy	5–7	9–5	5–7	8–6	—	2–11	10–11	2–4
4	Latvia	3–9	6–8	8–5	3–8	11–2	—	11–1	3–3
7	Poland	1–11	7–9	5–11	6–8	11–10	1–11	—	1–5

Group C Round Robin Summary Table
Pos.	Country	England	Hungary	Scotland	Slovakia	South Korea	Spain	Turkey	Record
4	England	—	8–7	4–11	4–10	10–11	10–3	9–5	3–3
5	Hungary	7–8	—	8–4	6–8	2–6	7–9	7–4	2–4
2	Scotland	11–4	4–8	—	6–3	5–10	9–6	9–2	4–2
3	Slovakia	10–4	8–6	3–6	—	6–7	8–6	9–5	4–2
1	South Korea	11–10	6–2	10–5	7–6	—	9–1	9–5	6–0
7	Spain	3–10	9–7	6–9	6–8	1–9	—	2–10	1–5
6	Turkey	5–9	4–7	2–9	5–9	5–9	10–2	—	1–5

== Round robin results ==
All draws times are listed in Greenwich Mean Time (UTC±0).

=== Draw 1 ===
Tuesday, March 11, 9:00

Sheet A	1	2	3	4	5	6	7	8	Final
Denmark (Christiansen-Schmidt / Ørbæk)	0	1	0	1	0	3	0	0	5
Latvia (Rožkova / Lasmans) 🔨	1	0	1	0	3	0	2	1	8

Sheet B	1	2	3	4	5	6	7	8	Final
Japan (Ogawa / Nakajima)	0	1	1	0	2	0	1	1	6
China (Wang / Yang) 🔨	1	0	0	1	0	3	0	0	5

Sheet C	1	2	3	4	5	6	7	8	Final
Finland (Lampinen / Tuomaala)	0	0	0	0	5	1	0	0	6
Switzerland (Jaquerod / Décorvet) 🔨	3	1	1	1	0	0	2	1	9

Sheet D	1	2	3	4	5	6	7	8	Final
United States (Dwyer / Emt)	0	1	1	2	2	0	1	0	7
Norway (Sveberg / Skogstad) 🔨	5	0	0	0	0	3	0	1	9

=== Draw 2 ===
Tuesday, March 11, 13:00

Sheet A	1	2	3	4	5	6	7	8	Final
Spain (Rodriguez / Tramont)	0	4	1	0	1	1	2	0	9
Hungary (Sasadi / Barkoczi) 🔨	1	0	0	4	0	0	0	2	7

Sheet B	1	2	3	4	5	6	7	8	Final
Estonia (Riidebach / Villau) 🔨	1	1	0	1	0	0	0	0	3
Czech Republic (Schmuttermeierova / Musilek)	0	0	2	0	1	2	1	1	7

Sheet C	1	2	3	4	5	6	7	8	Final
England (Aspey / Pimblett) 🔨	2	0	0	0	2	0	0	X	4
Scotland (McKenna / Nibloe)	0	2	3	2	0	3	1	X	11

Sheet D	1	2	3	4	5	6	7	8	Final
Poland (Kozakiewicz / Gasik-Daszkowski)	1	0	1	0	4	3	0	2	11
Italy (Berto / Ioriatti) 🔨	0	3	0	5	0	0	2	0	10

=== Draw 3 ===
Tuesday, March 11, 16:30

Sheet A	1	2	3	4	5	6	7	8	Final
Switzerland (Jaquerod / Décorvet)	0	1	0	1	1	3	0	0	6
Japan (Ogawa / Nakajima) 🔨	3	0	2	0	0	0	1	2	8

Sheet B	1	2	3	4	5	6	7	8	Final
United States (Dwyer / Emt) 🔨	1	2	2	0	5	0	X	X	10
Finland (Lampinen / Tuomaala)	0	0	0	1	0	1	X	X	2

Sheet C	1	2	3	4	5	6	7	8	Final
Norway (Sveberg / Skogstad) 🔨	2	3	2	0	0	1	2	X	10
Brazil (Miranda / Gabriel)	0	0	0	2	1	0	0	X	3

Sheet D	1	2	3	4	5	6	7	8	EE	Final
South Korea (Kim / Jeong) 🔨	3	0	0	1	0	0	0	2	1	7
Slovakia (Kunkelová / Ďuriš)	0	1	1	0	2	1	1	0	0	6

=== Draw 4 ===
Tuesday, March 11, 20:00

Sheet A	1	2	3	4	5	6	7	8	Final
Italy (Berto / Ioriatti)	0	0	2	1	1	0	1	0	5
Canada (Forrest / Ideson) 🔨	2	2	0	0	0	1	0	2	7

Sheet B	1	2	3	4	5	6	7	8	Final
Poland (Kozakiewicz / Gasik-Daszkowski) 🔨	3	0	0	1	0	1	0	X	5
Denmark (Christiansen-Schmidt / Ørbæk)	0	4	3	0	3	0	1	X	11

Sheet C	1	2	3	4	5	6	7	8	Final
Latvia (Rožkova / Lasmans) 🔨	0	0	2	1	0	0	0	X	3
Estonia (Riidebach / Villau)	1	2	0	0	3	1	1	X	8

Sheet D	1	2	3	4	5	6	7	8	Final
Turkey (Bingol / Gules)	0	0	1	1	0	0	0	X	2
Scotland (McKenna / Nibloe) 🔨	2	1	0	0	3	2	1	X	9

=== Draw 5 ===
Wednesday, March 12, 9:30

Sheet A	1	2	3	4	5	6	7	8	Final
England (Aspey / Pimblett)	0	1	0	2	1	0	0	X	4
Slovakia (Kunkelová / Ďuriš) 🔨	2	0	3	0	0	4	1	X	10

Sheet B	1	2	3	4	5	6	7	8	Final
Spain (Rodriguez / Tramont)	0	1	0	0	1	0	0	X	2
Turkey (Bingol / Gules) 🔨	2	0	3	2	0	1	2	X	10

Sheet C	1	2	3	4	5	6	7	8	Final
Switzerland (Jaquerod / Décorvet)	1	0	1	0	0	1	0	X	3
China (Wang / Yang) 🔨	0	3	0	1	1	0	1	X	6

Sheet D	1	2	3	4	5	6	7	8	Final
Hungary (Sasadi / Barkoczi)	1	0	0	0	0	1	0	X	2
South Korea (Kim / Jeong) 🔨	0	1	2	1	1	0	1	X	6

=== Draw 6 ===
Wednesday, March 12, 13:00

Sheet B	1	2	3	4	5	6	7	8	Final
Brazil (Miranda / Gabriel) 🔨	1	0	0	0	1	0	1	X	3
United States (Dwyer / Emt)	0	5	1	1	0	2	0	X	9

Sheet C	1	2	3	4	5	6	7	8	Final
Czech Republic (Schmuttermeierova / Musilek) 🔨	1	3	0	0	0	0	1	X	5
Canada (Forrest / Ideson)	0	0	5	2	1	2	0	X	10

Sheet D	1	2	3	4	5	6	7	8	Final
Italy (Berto / Ioriatti) 🔨	0	0	0	0	2	0	0	X	2
Latvia (Rožkova / Lasmans)	1	1	2	1	0	4	2	X	11

Sheet E	1	2	3	4	5	6	7	8	Final
Estonia (Riidebach / Villau) 🔨	3	0	4	2	0	1	2	0	12
Denmark (Christiansen-Schmidt / Ørbæk)	0	2	0	0	4	0	0	1	7

=== Draw 7 ===
Wednesday, March 12, 16:30

Sheet A	1	2	3	4	5	6	7	8	Final
Finland (Lampinen / Tuomaala)	0	0	1	0	0	0	2	X	3
China (Wang / Yang) 🔨	2	1	0	1	1	2	0	X	7

Sheet B	1	2	3	4	5	6	7	8	Final
Hungary (Sasadi / Barkoczi) 🔨	2	2	0	0	1	0	1	0	6
Slovakia (Kunkelová / Ďuriš)	0	0	4	1	0	2	0	1	8

Sheet C	1	2	3	4	5	6	7	8	Final
Turkey (Bingol / Gules) 🔨	0	1	0	3	0	0	1	0	5
England (Aspey / Pimblett)	2	0	3	0	2	1	0	1	9

Sheet D	1	2	3	4	5	6	7	8	Final
Norway (Sveberg / Skogstad) 🔨	1	3	0	1	0	2	0	2	9
Japan (Ogawa / Nakajima)	0	0	4	0	1	0	3	0	8

=== Draw 8 ===
Wednesday, March 12, 20:00

Sheet A	1	2	3	4	5	6	7	8	Final
Scotland (McKenna / Nibloe)	1	1	0	1	0	2	0	X	5
South Korea (Kim / Jeong) 🔨	0	0	5	0	1	0	4	X	10

Sheet B	1	2	3	4	5	6	7	8	Final
Denmark (Christiansen-Schmidt / Ørbæk)	1	1	0	1	1	1	0	2	7
Italy (Berto / Ioriatti) 🔨	0	0	2	0	0	0	3	0	5

Sheet C	1	2	3	4	5	6	7	8	Final
Estonia (Riidebach / Villau) 🔨	1	0	0	1	0	1	0	X	3
Canada (Forrest / Ideson)	0	3	2	0	4	0	5	X	14

Sheet D	1	2	3	4	5	6	7	8	EE	Final
Czech Republic (Schmuttermeierova / Musilek)	0	1	0	1	2	0	3	0	2	9
Poland (Kozakiewicz / Gasik-Daszkowski) 🔨	3	0	1	0	0	2	0	1	0	7

=== Draw 9 ===
Thursday, March 13, 9:30

Sheet A	1	2	3	4	5	6	7	8	Final
China (Wang / Yang) 🔨	3	1	0	3	1	0	3	X	11
Norway (Sveberg / Skogstad)	0	0	2	0	0	2	0	X	4

Sheet B	1	2	3	4	5	6	7	8	Final
Switzerland (Jaquerod / Décorvet)	0	2	0	1	0	0	0	0	3
United States (Dwyer / Emt) 🔨	2	0	1	0	1	1	1	1	7

Sheet C	1	2	3	4	5	6	7	8	Final
Brazil (Miranda / Gabriel) 🔨	0	2	0	1	1	0	0	1	5
Finland (Lampinen / Tuomaala)	1	0	1	0	0	3	1	0	6

Sheet D	1	2	3	4	5	6	7	8	EE	Final
Slovakia (Kunkelová / Ďuriš)	1	2	1	0	0	1	0	1	2	8
Spain (Rodriguez / Tramont) 🔨	0	0	0	3	2	0	1	0	0	6

=== Draw 10 ===
Thursday, March 13, 13:00

Sheet A	1	2	3	4	5	6	7	8	EE	Final
Latvia (Rožkova / Lasmans)	1	0	1	0	0	3	0	1	0	6
Czech Republic (Schmuttermeierova / Musilek) 🔨	0	1	0	3	1	0	1	0	2	8

Sheet B	1	2	3	4	5	6	7	8	Final
Turkey (Bingol / Gules)	0	0	3	0	1	0	1	X	5
South Korea (Kim / Jeong) 🔨	1	3	0	3	0	2	0	X	9

Sheet C	1	2	3	4	5	6	7	8	Final
Scotland (McKenna / Nibloe)	0	0	2	0	1	0	1	X	4
Hungary (Sasadi / Barkoczi) 🔨	3	1	0	3	0	1	0	X	8

Sheet E	1	2	3	4	5	6	7	8	Final
Italy (Berto / Ioriatti)	0	3	1	2	0	1	0	1	8
Estonia (Riidebach / Villau) 🔨	1	0	0	0	2	0	3	0	6

=== Draw 11 ===
Thursday, March 13, 16:30

Sheet B	1	2	3	4	5	6	7	8	Final
Japan (Ogawa / Nakajima) 🔨	0	4	4	2	0	1	0	0	11
Brazil (Miranda / Gabriel)	1	0	0	0	6	0	5	1	13

Sheet C	1	2	3	4	5	6	7	8	Final
Finland (Lampinen / Tuomaala)	1	0	1	0	0	0	0	X	3
Norway (Sveberg / Skogstad) 🔨	0	3	0	1	4	1	0	X	9

Sheet D	1	2	3	4	5	6	7	8	Final
Canada (Forrest / Ideson)	2	0	5	1	2	1	X	X	11
Poland (Kozakiewicz / Gasik-Daszkowski) 🔨	0	1	0	0	0	0	X	X	1

Sheet E	1	2	3	4	5	6	7	8	Final
China (Wang / Yang) 🔨	2	0	0	0	0	4	0	0	6
United States (Dwyer / Emt)	0	1	2	1	1	0	3	1	9

=== Draw 12 ===
Thursday, March 13, 20:00

Sheet A	1	2	3	4	5	6	7	8	Final
Hungary (Sasadi / Barkoczi) 🔨	2	0	3	1	0	0	1	0	7
Turkey (Bingol / Gules)	0	1	0	0	1	1	0	1	4

Sheet B	1	2	3	4	5	6	7	8	Final
Slovakia (Kunkelová / Ďuriš)	0	0	0	0	0	2	1	0	3
Scotland (McKenna / Nibloe) 🔨	1	1	1	1	1	0	0	1	6

Sheet D	1	2	3	4	5	6	7	8	EE	Final
Denmark (Christiansen-Schmidt / Ørbæk) 🔨	0	1	0	1	0	0	2	1	0	5
Czech Republic (Schmuttermeierova / Musilek)	1	0	1	0	2	1	0	0	1	6

Sheet E	1	2	3	4	5	6	7	8	Final
Spain (Rodriguez / Tramont) 🔨	0	0	3	0	0	0	0	X	3
England (Aspey / Pimblett)	1	1	0	2	3	2	1	X	10

=== Draw 13 ===
Friday, March 14, 9:30

Sheet A	1	2	3	4	5	6	7	8	Final
Poland (Kozakiewicz / Gasik-Daszkowski) 🔨	0	0	0	0	1	4	0	1	6
Estonia (Riidebach / Villau)	1	1	3	2	0	0	1	0	8

Sheet B	1	2	3	4	5	6	7	8	Final
England (Aspey / Pimblett) 🔨	0	1	0	0	0	3	0	4	8
Hungary (Sasadi / Barkoczi)	1	0	2	1	1	0	2	0	7

Sheet C	1	2	3	4	5	6	7	8	Final
South Korea (Kim / Jeong) 🔨	1	0	2	1	1	2	2	X	9
Spain (Rodriguez / Tramont)	0	1	0	0	0	0	0	X	1

Sheet D	1	2	3	4	5	6	7	8	Final
Canada (Forrest / Ideson) 🔨	2	0	2	0	5	0	X	X	9
Latvia (Rožkova / Lasmans)	0	1	0	1	0	1	X	X	3

=== Draw 14 ===
Friday, March 14, 13:00

Sheet A	1	2	3	4	5	6	7	8	Final
Norway (Sveberg / Skogstad)	0	3	1	0	4	2	1	X	11
Switzerland (Jaquerod / Décorvet) 🔨	2	0	0	2	0	0	0	X	4

Sheet B	1	2	3	4	5	6	7	8	Final
China (Wang / Yang) 🔨	3	2	2	2	0	4	1	X	14
Brazil (Miranda / Gabriel)	0	0	0	0	1	0	0	X	1

Sheet C	1	2	3	4	5	6	7	8	Final
Czech Republic (Schmuttermeierova / Musilek) 🔨	3	0	0	2	0	0	0	X	5
Italy (Berto / Ioriatti)	0	1	1	0	3	2	2	X	9

Sheet D	1	2	3	4	5	6	7	8	Final
Japan (Ogawa / Nakajima)	0	0	3	1	2	3	2	X	11
Finland (Lampinen / Tuomaala) 🔨	1	2	0	0	0	0	0	X	3

=== Draw 15 ===
Friday, March 14, 16:30

Sheet A	1	2	3	4	5	6	7	8	Final
Canada (Forrest / Ideson)	0	0	2	1	2	0	2	2	9
Denmark (Christiansen-Schmidt / Ørbæk) 🔨	1	2	0	0	0	1	0	0	4

Sheet B	1	2	3	4	5	6	7	8	Final
Latvia (Rožkova / Lasmans) 🔨	2	3	0	1	1	4	X	X	11
Poland (Kozakiewicz / Gasik-Daszkowski)	0	0	1	0	0	0	X	X	1

Sheet C	1	2	3	4	5	6	7	8	Final
Slovakia (Kunkelová / Ďuriš) 🔨	1	0	3	0	5	0	0	X	9
Turkey (Bingol / Gules)	0	1	0	1	0	2	1	X	5

=== Draw 16 ===
Friday, March 14, 20:00

Sheet A	1	2	3	4	5	6	7	8	Final
South Korea (Kim / Jeong) 🔨	1	3	0	2	0	4	1	0	11
England (Aspey / Pimblett)	0	0	3	0	3	0	0	4	10

Sheet B	1	2	3	4	5	6	7	8	Final
Scotland (McKenna / Nibloe)	0	2	0	0	3	0	4	X	9
Spain (Rodriguez / Tramont) 🔨	2	0	2	1	0	1	0	X	6

Sheet C	1	2	3	4	5	6	7	8	Final
United States (Dwyer / Emt) 🔨	0	3	0	1	0	0	3	0	7
Japan (Ogawa / Nakajima)	2	0	1	0	1	2	0	2	8

Sheet D	1	2	3	4	5	6	7	8	Final
Brazil (Miranda / Gabriel)	0	1	1	0	0	2	0	1	5
Switzerland (Jaquerod / Décorvet) 🔨	1	0	0	3	3	0	1	0	8

== Playoffs ==
Quarterfinals
1	South Korea	8
8	Slovakia	5
4	Czech Republic	4
5	Scotland	10
3	Canada	6
6	Japan	7
2	Norway	3
7	Estonia	7

Semifinals
1	South Korea	5
5	Scotland	6
6	Japan	9
7	Estonia	4

Final
5	Scotland	2
6	Japan	11
Bronze medal game
1	South Korea	5
7	Estonia	9

=== Quarterfinals ===
Saturday, March 15, 10:00

Sheet A	1	2	3	4	5	6	7	8	Final
Canada (Forrest / Ideson)	0	0	4	0	0	1	0	1	6
Japan (Ogawa / Nakajima) 🔨	1	2	0	1	1	0	2	0	7

Sheet B	1	2	3	4	5	6	7	8	Final
Norway (Sveberg / Skogstad)	0	0	1	1	1	0	0	X	3
Estonia (Riidebach / Villau) 🔨	2	2	0	0	0	1	2	X	7

Sheet C	1	2	3	4	5	6	7	8	Final
South Korea (Kim / Jeong) 🔨	1	2	0	0	0	1	3	1	8
Slovakia (Kunkelová / Ďuriš)	0	0	2	2	1	0	0	0	5

Sheet D	1	2	3	4	5	6	7	8	Final
Czech Republic (Schmuttermeierova / Musilek)	0	0	2	1	1	0	0	X	4
Scotland (McKenna / Nibloe) 🔨	3	2	0	0	0	3	2	X	10

=== Semifinals ===
Saturday, March 15, 17:00

Sheet A	1	2	3	4	5	6	7	8	Final
South Korea (Kim / Jeong) 🔨	1	0	2	1	0	0	1	0	5
Scotland (McKenna / Nibloe)	0	1	0	0	2	1	0	2	6

Sheet D	1	2	3	4	5	6	7	8	Final
Japan (Ogawa / Nakajima) 🔨	1	1	0	2	4	1	0	X	9
Estonia (Riidebach / Villau)	0	0	3	0	0	0	1	X	4

=== Bronze medal game ===
Sunday, March 16, 10:00

Sheet B	1	2	3	4	5	6	7	8	Final
South Korea (Kim / Jeong)	0	2	0	0	3	0	0	X	5
Estonia (Riidebach / Villau) 🔨	1	0	2	2	0	3	1	X	9

=== Final ===
Sunday, March 16, 14:00

Sheet C	1	2	3	4	5	6	7	8	Final
Scotland (McKenna / Nibloe) 🔨	0	2	0	0	0	0	X	X	2
Japan (Ogawa / Nakajima)	1	0	3	1	3	3	X	X	11

== Final standings ==
Place	Team
1st place, gold medalist(s)	Japan
2nd place, silver medalist(s)	Scotland
3rd place, bronze medalist(s)	Estonia
4	South Korea
5	Norway
6	Canada
7	Czech Republic
8	Slovakia
9	United States
10	China
11	Latvia
12	England
13	Hungary
14	Switzerland
15	Denmark
16	Italy
17	Finland
18	Turkey
19	Poland
20	Brazil
21	Spain

== See also ==
- 2025 World Wheelchair Curling Championship
