= 2015 World Wheelchair Curling Championship – Qualification Event =

2015 World Wheelchair Curling Championship Qualification Event
- Host city: Lillehammer, Norway
- Arena: Lillehammer Curling Club
- Dates: November 1–6, 2014
- Winner: Norway
- Skip: Rune Lorentsen
- Third: Jostein Stordahl
- Second: Sissel Løchen
- Lead: Terge Rafdal
- Alternate: Ole Fredrik Syversen
- Coach: Per Andreassen
- Finalist: Germany (Jens Jäger)

The qualification event of the 2015 World Wheelchair Curling Championship was held from November 1 to 6, 2014 at the Lillehammer Curling Club in Lillehammer, Norway. The qualification event was open to any World Curling Federation member nation not already qualified for the World Championship. The event's two top finishers, Norway and Germany, will join the top eight finishers from the last World Wheelchair Curling Championship at this season's event in Lohja, Finland.

This event would have marked the first appearance of Israel at an international wheelchair curling event, but Israel was deemed ineligible to play due to an inability to meet classification criteria.

== Teams ==
Bulgaria	Czech Republic	Denmark	Germany
Skip: Ivan Shopov; Third: Svetozar Kirov; Second: Pavel Savov; Lead: Joanna Koldova; Alternate: Neli Sabeva; Coach: Nikolay Runtov	Skip: Radek Musílek; Third: Martin Tluk; Second: Stepan Benes; Lead: Jana Břinčilová; Alternate: Žaneta Schmuttermeierová; Coach: Kateřina Urbanová	Skip: Preben Granhøj Nielsen; Third: Henrik Harlev; Second: Helena Skovgaard; Lead: Rene Graff; Coach: Kasper Poulsen	Skip: Jens Jäger; Third: Christiane Putzich; Second: Martin Schlitt; Lead: Heike Melchior; Alternate: Robert Hering; Coach: Bernd Weisser
Israel	Italy	Japan	Latvia
Did not start Skip: Tzipi Zipper; Third: David Drai; Second: Shachar Levi; Lead: Albert Zohar	Fourth: Egidio Marchese; Skip: Emanuele Spelorzi; Second: Sergio Deflorian; Lead: Angela Menardi; Alternate: Rita Dal Monte; Coach: Roberto Maino	Skip: Takashi Sakataya; Third: Kazuhiro Kashiwabara; Second: Tsutomu Iwata; Lead: Kana Matsuda; Alternate: Sanae Aso; Coach: Tsutomu Kobayashi	Skip: Ojārs Briedis; Third: Poļina Rožkova; Second: Ilmārs Nicmanis; Lead: Agris Lasmans; Alternate: Sergejs Černiševs; Coach: Artis Zentelis
Norway	Slovenia	South Korea	Switzerland
Skip: Rune Lorentsen; Third: Jostein Stordahl; Second: Sissel Løchen; Lead: Terje Rafdal; Alternate: Ole Fredrik Syversen; Coach: Per Andreassen	Skip: Robert Zerovnik; Third: Ziga Badje; Second: Milan Zlobko; Lead: Mojca Burger; Alternate: Ziva Hribar; Coach: Gregor Verbinc	Skip: Kim Jong-pan; Third: Seo Soon-seok; Second: Jung Seung-won; Lead: Yun Hee-kyeong; Alternate: Yang Hui-tae; Coach: Shin Kyung-yong	Skip: Felix Wagner; Third: Eric Decorvet; Second: Claudia Hüttenmoser; Lead: Ivo Hasler; Alternate: Mireille Gauthey; Coach: Stephan Pfister

== Round-robin standings ==
Final round-robin standings

Key
Teams to Playoffs

Red Group	Skip	W	L
Latvia	Ojārs Briedis	3	1
South Korea	Kim Jong-pan	3	1
Japan	Takashi Sakataya	2	2
Czech Republic	Radek Musílek	2	2
Denmark	Preben Nielsen	0	4

Blue Group	Skip	W	L
Norway	Rune Lorentsen	5	0
Germany	Jens Jäger	4	1
Italy	Emanuele Spelorzi	3	2
Switzerland	Felix Wagner	2	3
Slovenia	Robert Zerovnik	1	4
Bulgaria	Ivan Shopov	0	5

== Round-robin results ==
=== Draw 1 ===
Saturday, November 1, 15:30

Sheet A	1	2	3	4	5	6	7	8	Final
Japan (Sakataya)	0	1	0	0	2	0	1	X	4
Czech Republic (Musílek) 🔨	4	0	2	3	0	2	0	X	11

Sheet B	1	2	3	4	5	6	7	8	Final
South Korea (Kim) 🔨	2	0	1	2	3	0	X	X	8
Denmark (Nielsen)	0	1	0	0	0	1	X	X	2

=== Draw 2 ===
Sunday, November 2, 10:00

Sheet A	1	2	3	4	5	6	7	8	Final
Germany (Jäger)	2	3	0	2	1	4	1	X	13
Slovenia (Zerovnik) 🔨	0	0	1	0	0	0	0	X	1

Sheet B	1	2	3	4	5	6	7	8	Final
Bulgaria (Shopov)	0	0	1	0	0	1	0	X	2
Norway (Lorentsen) 🔨	5	6	0	2	2	0	4	X	19

Sheet C	1	2	3	4	5	6	7	8	Final
Switzerland (Wagner)	1	0	0	1	0	2	0	1	5
Italy (Spelorzi) 🔨	0	1	1	0	1	0	3	0	6

=== Draw 3 ===
Sunday, November 2, 16:00

Sheet B	1	2	3	4	5	6	7	8	Final
Latvia (Briedis)	5	0	2	0	1	0	1	0	9
Czech Republic (Musílek)	0	1	0	1	0	5	0	1	8

Sheet C	1	2	3	4	5	6	7	8	Final
Japan (Sakataya)	1	0	3	0	1	0	2	1	8
Denmark (Nielsen) 🔨	0	4	0	1	0	1	0	0	6

=== Draw 4 ===
Monday, November 3, 10:00

Sheet A	1	2	3	4	5	6	7	8	Final
Bulgaria (Shopov)	0	0	0	0	1	0	X	X	1
Switzerland (Wagner) 🔨	7	2	1	3	0	4	X	X	17

Sheet B	1	2	3	4	5	6	7	8	Final
Italy (Spelorzi) 🔨	2	0	1	0	2	5	2	X	12
Slovenia (Zerovnik)	0	3	0	1	0	0	0	X	4

Sheet C	1	2	3	4	5	6	7	8	Final
Germany (Jäger)	0	2	0	1	1	0	0	X	4
Norway (Lorentsen) 🔨	3	0	2	0	0	2	3	X	10

=== Draw 5 ===
Monday, November 3, 14:00

Sheet A	1	2	3	4	5	6	7	8	Final
Denmark (Nielsen)	0	2	0	0	3	0	X	X	5
Latvia (Briedis) 🔨	5	0	4	1	0	3	X	X	13

Sheet B	1	2	3	4	5	6	7	8	Final
Japan (Sakataya) 🔨	0	0	0	4	0	0	1	0	5
South Korea (Kim)	1	1	2	0	1	0	0	1	6

=== Draw 6 ===
Monday, November 3, 18:00

Sheet A	1	2	3	4	5	6	7	8	EE	Final
Norway (Lorentsen)	0	2	0	2	0	0	2	0	2	8
Italy (Spelorzi) 🔨	2	0	1	0	1	1	0	1	0	6

Sheet B	1	2	3	4	5	6	7	8	Final
Germany (Jäger) 🔨	6	4	2	4	1	2	X	X	19
Bulgaria (Shopov)	0	0	0	0	0	0	X	X	0

Sheet C	1	2	3	4	5	6	7	8	Final
Slovenia (Zerovnik)	1	0	0	0	0	0	0	X	1
Switzerland (Wagner) 🔨	0	2	3	4	1	1	3	X	14

=== Draw 7 ===
Tuesday, November 4, 10:00

Sheet A	1	2	3	4	5	6	7	8	Final
Latvia (Briedis) 🔨	1	0	3	0	0	0	1	0	5
Japan (Sakataya)	0	0	0	3	1	2	0	2	8

Sheet C	1	2	3	4	5	6	7	8	Final
South Korea (Kim) 🔨	2	0	3	1	1	0	0	X	7
Czech Republic (Musílek)	0	1	0	0	0	2	1	X	4

=== Draw 8 ===
Tuesday, November 4, 16:00

Sheet A	1	2	3	4	5	6	7	8	Final
Italy (Spelorzi)	0	0	2	0	1	0	1	X	4
Germany (Jäger) 🔨	2	2	0	1	0	3	0	X	8

Sheet B	1	2	3	4	5	6	7	8	Final
Norway (Lorentsen) 🔨	0	2	2	0	2	0	2	1	9
Switzerland (Wagner)	1	0	0	2	0	2	0	0	5

Sheet C	1	2	3	4	5	6	7	8	Final
Bulgaria (Shopov) 🔨	0	1	2	0	1	0	0	X	4
Slovenia (Zerovnik)	3	0	0	2	0	2	4	X	11

=== Draw 9 ===
Wednesday, November 5, 10:00

Sheet A	1	2	3	4	5	6	7	8	Final
Czech Republic (Musílek)	3	0	1	1	4	2	0	X	11
Denmark (Nielsen) 🔨	0	1	0	0	0	0	2	X	3

Sheet C	1	2	3	4	5	6	7	8	Final
Latvia (Briedis)	0	1	0	1	0	0	3	1	6
South Korea (Kim) 🔨	1	0	1	0	0	2	0	0	4

=== Draw 10 ===
Wednesday, November 5, 14:00

Sheet A	1	2	3	4	5	6	7	8	Final
Slovenia (Zerovnik)	2	2	0	1	0	1	0	X	6
Norway (Lorentsen) 🔨	0	0	6	0	2	0	2	X	10

Sheet B	1	2	3	4	5	6	7	8	Final
Switzerland (Wagner)	0	1	0	4	1	0	0	1	7
Germany (Jäger) 🔨	1	0	3	0	0	4	1	0	9

Sheet C	1	2	3	4	5	6	7	8	Final
Italy (Spelorzi) 🔨	4	3	3	0	1	1	X	X	12
Bulgaria (Shopov)	0	0	0	1	0	0	X	X	1

== Playoffs ==
Second Place Game
R1	Latvia	5
B2	Germany	6

Semifinals
R1	Latvia	1
B1	Norway	8
R2	South Korea	6
B2	Germany	7

=== R1 vs. B1 ===
Thursday, November 6, 10:00

Team	1	2	3	4	5	6	7	8	Final
Latvia (Briedis)	0	0	0	0	0	0	1	X	1
Norway (Lorentsen) 🔨	2	1	1	2	1	1	0	X	8

Norway advances to World Championship.
Latvia goes to Second Place Game.

=== R2 vs. B2 ===
Thursday, November 6, 10:00

Team	1	2	3	4	5	6	7	8	EE	Final
South Korea (Kim) 🔨	2	0	2	0	1	0	1	0	0	6
Germany (Jäger)	0	2	0	2	0	1	0	1	1	7

Germany advances to Second Place Game.

=== Second Place Game ===
Thursday, November 6, 15:00

Team	1	2	3	4	5	6	7	8	Final
Latvia (Briedis)	1	0	0	1	1	0	2	0	5
Germany (Jäger) 🔨	0	1	3	0	0	1	0	1	6

Germany advances to World Championship.
