= Cho Yae-lee =

South Korean wheelchair curler

- Curler ♀
- Born: June 2, 1984 (age 42)

Curling career
- Member Association: South Korea
- World Wheelchair Championship: 2 (2004, 2005)
Medal record
Wheelchair curling

Cho Yae-lee (Korean: 조애리; born June 2, 1984) is a South Korean female wheelchair curler.

== Wheelchair curling teams and events ==
Season	Skip	Third	Second	Lead	Alternate	Coach	Events
2003–04	Kim Hak-sung	Kim Myung-jin	Cho Yae-lee	Cho Yang-hyun	Kim Kab-seung	Yang Se-young	WWhCC 2004 (11th)
2004–05	Kim Hak-sung	Kim Myung-jin	Cho Yang-hyun	Cho Yae-lee	Ham Dong-hee	Kim Chang-gyu	WWhCC 2005 (7th)
