= Kim Kab-seung =

South Korean wheelchair curler

- Curler ♂
- Born: July 19, 1966 (age 60)

Curling career
- Member Association: South Korea
- World Wheelchair Championship: 1 (2004)
Medal record
Wheelchair curling

Kim Kab-seung (Korean: 김갑승; born July 19, 1966) is a South Korean male wheelchair curler.

== Wheelchair curling teams and events ==
Season	Skip	Third	Second	Lead	Alternate	Coach	Events
2003–04	Kim Hak-sung	Kim Myung-jin	Cho Yae-lee	Cho Yang-hyun	Kim Kab-seung	Yang Se-young	WWhCC 2004 (11th)
