= 2008 World Wheelchair Curling Championship =

- Host city: Sursee, Switzerland
- Arena: Eishalle Sursee
- Dates: February 2–9
- Winner: Norway
- Skip: Rune Lorentsen
- Third: Jostein Stordahl
- Second: Geir Arne Skogstad
- Lead: Lene Tystad
- Alternate: Anne Mette Samdal
- Finalist: South Korea (Kim Hak-sung)

The 2008 World Wheelchair Curling Championship was held from February 2 to 9 at the Eishalle Sursee in Sursee, Switzerland.

== Qualification ==
- Switzerland (Host country)
- Top seven finishers from the 2007 World Wheelchair Curling Championship (not including host):
  - Canada
  - Scotland
  - Norway
  - Japan
  - United States
  - South Korea
  - Russia
- Top teams from qualifying event:
  - Sweden
  - Italy

=== Qualification event ===
Two teams outside of the top finishers, Sweden and Italy, qualified from a qualifying event held in November 2007 in Inverness, Scotland.

== Teams ==
| Canada | Italy | Japan | Norway | Russia |
|---|---|---|---|---|
| Fourth: Darryl Neighbour Skip: Gerry Austgarden; Second: Ina Forrest; Lead: Sonja Gaudet; Alternate: Gary Cormack; Coach: Joe Rea | Skip: Andrea Tabanelli Third: Egidio Marchese; Second: Gabriele Dallapiccola; Lead: Lucrezia Celentano; Alternate: Danilo Destro; Coach: Mauro Maino | Skip: Yoji Nakajima Third: Katsuo Ichikawa; Second: Takashi Hidai; Lead: Ayako Saitoh; Alternate: Mari Yamazaki; Coach: Kumiko Ogihara | Skip: Rune Lorentsen Third: Jostein Stordahl; Second: Geir Arne Skogstad; Lead: Lene Tystad; Alternate: Anne Mette Samdal; Coach: Thoralf Hognestad | Skip: Andrey Smirnov Third: Nikolay Melnikov; Second: Marat Romanov; Lead: Oxana Slesarenko; Alternate: Oleg Makarov; Coach: Efim Zhidelev |
| Scotland | South Korea | Sweden | Switzerland | United States |
| Skip: Michael McCreadie Third: Aileen Neilson; Second: Tom Killin; Lead: James Sellar; Alternate: Rosemary Lenton; Coach: Tom Pendreigh | Skip: Kim Hak-sung Third: Kim Myung-jin; Second: Cho Yang-hyun; Lead: Kang Mi-suk; Alternate: Ham Dong-hee; Coach: Kwon Young-il | Skip: Jalle Jungnell Third: Glenn Ikonen; Second: Bernt Sjöberg; Lead: Kristina Ulander; Alternate: Anna Hammarlind; Coach: Olle Brudsten | Skip: Manfred Bolliger Third: Erwin Lauper; Second: Cesare Cassani; Lead: Madeleine Wildi; Alternate: Therese Kämpfer; Coach: Nadia Röthlisberger-Raspe | Fourth: James Pierce Skip: Augusto Perez; Second: James Joseph; Lead: Jacqueline Kapinowski; Alternate: Bob Prenoveau; Coach: Steve Brown |

== Round-robin standings ==
Key
| Teams to Playoffs |
| Teams to Tiebreaker |

| Country | Skip | W | L |
|---|---|---|---|
| South Korea | Kim Hak-sung | 7 | 2 |
| Canada | Gerry Austgarden | 6 | 3 |
| Norway | Rune Lorentsen | 6 | 3 |
| United States | Augusto Perez | 5 | 4 |
| Italy | Andrea Tabanelli | 5 | 4 |
| Sweden | Jalle Jungnell | 4 | 5 |
| Scotland | Michael McCreadie | 3 | 6 |
| Switzerland | Manfred Bolliger | 3 | 6 |
| Japan | Yoji Nakajima | 3 | 6 |
| Russia | Andrey Smirnov | 3 | 6 |

== Round-robin results ==
=== Draw 1 ===
Saturday, February 2, 18:00

| Sheet A | 1 | 2 | 3 | 4 | 5 | 6 | Final |
| Switzerland (Bolliger) | 0 | 2 | 0 | 4 | 1 | 0 | 7 |
| Scotland (McCreadie) 🔨 | 1 | 0 | 2 | 0 | 0 | 1 | 4 |

| Sheet B | 1 | 2 | 3 | 4 | 5 | 6 | Final |
| Norway (Lorentsen) 🔨 | 1 | 0 | 3 | 0 | 0 | 1 | 5 |
| Sweden (Jungnell) | 0 | 1 | 0 | 1 | 1 | 0 | 3 |

| Sheet C | 1 | 2 | 3 | 4 | 5 | 6 | Final |
| Italy (Tabanelli) 🔨 | 1 | 1 | 2 | 1 | 1 | 1 | 7 |
| Canada (Austgarden) | 0 | 0 | 0 | 0 | 0 | 0 | 0 |

| Sheet D | 1 | 2 | 3 | 4 | 5 | 6 | Final |
| Russia (Smirnov) | 0 | 2 | 0 | 0 | 0 | 1 | 3 |
| South Korea (Kim) 🔨 | 2 | 0 | 2 | 3 | 2 | 0 | 9 |

| Sheet E | 1 | 2 | 3 | 4 | 5 | 6 | Final |
| United States (Perez) 🔨 | 2 | 1 | 0 | 3 | 1 | 3 | 10 |
| Japan (Nakajima) | 0 | 0 | 2 | 0 | 0 | 0 | 2 |

=== Draw 2 ===
Monday, February 3, 10:00

| Sheet A | 1 | 2 | 3 | 4 | 5 | 6 | Final |
| United States (Perez) | 0 | 1 | 0 | 0 | 2 | 0 | 3 |
| Norway (Lorentsen) 🔨 | 2 | 0 | 2 | 1 | 0 | 1 | 6 |

| Sheet B | 1 | 2 | 3 | 4 | 5 | 6 | Final |
| Canada (Austgarden) 🔨 | 1 | 4 | 0 | 1 | 2 | X | 8 |
| Japan (Nakajima) | 0 | 0 | 1 | 0 | 0 | X | 1 |

| Sheet C | 1 | 2 | 3 | 4 | 5 | 6 | Final |
| Switzerland (Bolliger) | 0 | 2 | 2 | 2 | 2 | 0 | 8 |
| Russia (Smirnov) 🔨 | 4 | 0 | 0 | 0 | 0 | 3 | 7 |

| Sheet D | 1 | 2 | 3 | 4 | 5 | 6 | Final |
| Italy (Tabanelli) | 0 | 2 | 0 | 0 | 3 | 4 | 9 |
| Scotland (McCreadie) 🔨 | 2 | 0 | 2 | 1 | 0 | 0 | 5 |

| Sheet E | 1 | 2 | 3 | 4 | 5 | 6 | Final |
| Sweden (Jungnell) | 0 | 0 | 0 | 0 | 0 | X | 0 |
| South Korea (Kim) 🔨 | 1 | 1 | 3 | 2 | 2 | X | 9 |

=== Draw 3 ===
Monday, February 3, 15:30

| Sheet A | 1 | 2 | 3 | 4 | 5 | 6 | Final |
| South Korea (Kim) 🔨 | 1 | 3 | 0 | 0 | 3 | 0 | 7 |
| Japan (Nakajima) | 0 | 0 | 1 | 2 | 0 | 1 | 4 |

| Sheet B | 1 | 2 | 3 | 4 | 5 | 6 | Final |
| Scotland (McCreadie) | 2 | 2 | 1 | 0 | 2 | 1 | 8 |
| Russia (Smirnov) 🔨 | 0 | 0 | 0 | 1 | 0 | 0 | 1 |

| Sheet C | 1 | 2 | 3 | 4 | 5 | 6 | Final |
| Sweden (Jungnell) 🔨 | 2 | 2 | 0 | 4 | 0 | 0 | 8 |
| United States (Perez) | 0 | 0 | 2 | 0 | 1 | 1 | 4 |

| Sheet D | 1 | 2 | 3 | 4 | 5 | 6 | Final |
| Canada (Austgarden) 🔨 | 0 | 1 | 3 | 0 | 1 | 0 | 5 |
| Switzerland (Bolliger) | 1 | 0 | 0 | 0 | 0 | 1 | 2 |

| Sheet E | 1 | 2 | 3 | 4 | 5 | 6 | Final |
| Italy (Tabanelli) | 0 | 2 | 0 | 0 | 1 | 1 | 4 |
| Norway (Lorentsen) 🔨 | 1 | 0 | 3 | 1 | 0 | 0 | 5 |

=== Draw 4 ===
Tuesday, February 4, 10:00

| Sheet A | 1 | 2 | 3 | 4 | 5 | 6 | Final |
| Scotland (McCreadie) 🔨 | 0 | 0 | 1 | 0 | 0 | 2 | 3 |
| Sweden (Jungnell) | 2 | 1 | 0 | 1 | 2 | 0 | 6 |

| Sheet B | 1 | 2 | 3 | 4 | 5 | 6 | Final |
| Italy (Tabanelli) | 1 | 0 | 4 | 1 | 1 | 0 | 7 |
| Switzerland (Bolliger) 🔨 | 0 | 2 | 0 | 0 | 0 | 2 | 4 |

| Sheet C | 1 | 2 | 3 | 4 | 5 | 6 | Final |
| Norway (Lorentsen) 🔨 | 2 | 0 | 1 | 2 | 0 | 0 | 5 |
| Japan (Nakajima) | 0 | 1 | 0 | 0 | 2 | 1 | 4 |

| Sheet D | 1 | 2 | 3 | 4 | 5 | 6 | Final |
| South Korea (Kim) 🔨 | 1 | 0 | 2 | 0 | 0 | 0 | 3 |
| United States (Perez) | 0 | 2 | 0 | 2 | 2 | 1 | 7 |

| Sheet E | 1 | 2 | 3 | 4 | 5 | 6 | EE | Final |
| Russia (Smirnov) 🔨 | 0 | 1 | 1 | 0 | 0 | 2 | 0 | 4 |
| Canada (Austgarden) | 1 | 0 | 0 | 1 | 2 | 0 | 4 | 8 |

=== Draw 5 ===
Tuesday, February 4, 15:30

| Sheet A | 1 | 2 | 3 | 4 | 5 | 6 | Final |
| Italy (Tabanelli) 🔨 | 2 | 0 | 2 | 2 | 0 | 1 | 7 |
| United States (Perez) | 0 | 3 | 0 | 0 | 2 | 0 | 5 |

| Sheet B | 1 | 2 | 3 | 4 | 5 | 6 | Final |
| Sweden (Jungnell) | 0 | 1 | 0 | 2 | 1 | 0 | 4 |
| Canada (Austgarden) 🔨 | 2 | 0 | 3 | 0 | 0 | 2 | 7 |

| Sheet C | 1 | 2 | 3 | 4 | 5 | 6 | Final |
| Scotland (McCreadie) 🔨 | 0 | 1 | 0 | 0 | 2 | 0 | 3 |
| South Korea (Kim) | 2 | 0 | 1 | 1 | 0 | 1 | 5 |

| Sheet D | 1 | 2 | 3 | 4 | 5 | 6 | Final |
| Norway (Lorentsen) 🔨 | 1 | 0 | 0 | 0 | 2 | 0 | 3 |
| Russia (Smirnov) | 0 | 2 | 2 | 2 | 0 | 2 | 8 |

| Sheet E | 1 | 2 | 3 | 4 | 5 | 6 | EE | Final |
| Japan (Nakajima) | 0 | 2 | 0 | 0 | 4 | 0 | 1 | 7 |
| Switzerland (Bolliger) 🔨 | 1 | 0 | 2 | 2 | 0 | 1 | 0 | 6 |

=== Draw 6 ===
Wednesday, February 5, 10:00

| Sheet A | 1 | 2 | 3 | 4 | 5 | 6 | Final |
| Japan (Nakajima) | 0 | 1 | 2 | 0 | 3 | 0 | 6 |
| Russia (Smirnov) 🔨 | 2 | 0 | 0 | 2 | 0 | 0 | 4 |

| Sheet B | 1 | 2 | 3 | 4 | 5 | 6 | Final |
| Switzerland (Bolliger) 🔨 | 0 | 0 | 0 | 0 | 1 | 0 | 1 |
| South Korea (Kim) | 0 | 2 | 1 | 0 | 0 | 3 | 6 |

| Sheet C | 1 | 2 | 3 | 4 | 5 | 6 | Final |
| Canada (Austgarden) | 1 | 1 | 2 | 1 | 2 | X | 7 |
| Norway (Lorentsen) 🔨 | 0 | 0 | 0 | 0 | 0 | X | 0 |

| Sheet D | 1 | 2 | 3 | 4 | 5 | 6 | Final |
| Sweden (Jungnell) 🔨 | 0 | 2 | 2 | 0 | 1 | 0 | 5 |
| Italy (Tabanelli) | 1 | 0 | 0 | 1 | 0 | 1 | 3 |

| Sheet E | 1 | 2 | 3 | 4 | 5 | 6 | Final |
| Scotland (McCreadie) 🔨 | 0 | 0 | 0 | 1 | 0 | 0 | 1 |
| United States (Perez) | 2 | 2 | 2 | 0 | 1 | 2 | 9 |

=== Draw 7 ===
Wednesday, February 5, 15:30

| Sheet A | 1 | 2 | 3 | 4 | 5 | 6 | Final |
| Norway (Lorentsen) | 0 | 1 | 3 | 0 | 0 | 0 | 4 |
| Switzerland (Bolliger) 🔨 | 2 | 0 | 0 | 1 | 2 | 2 | 7 |

| Sheet B | 1 | 2 | 3 | 4 | 5 | 6 | Final |
| Japan (Nakajima) 🔨 | 2 | 0 | 0 | 0 | 0 | X | 2 |
| Scotland (McCreadie) | 0 | 2 | 1 | 1 | 5 | X | 9 |

| Sheet C | 1 | 2 | 3 | 4 | 5 | 6 | Final |
| Russia (Smirnov) 🔨 | 2 | 0 | 3 | 0 | 1 | X | 6 |
| Sweden (Jungnell) | 0 | 1 | 0 | 2 | 0 | X | 3 |

| Sheet D | 1 | 2 | 3 | 4 | 5 | 6 | Final |
| United States (Perez) | 0 | 0 | 0 | 1 | 3 | 0 | 4 |
| Canada (Austgarden) 🔨 | 2 | 1 | 0 | 0 | 0 | 2 | 5 |

| Sheet E | 1 | 2 | 3 | 4 | 5 | 6 | Final |
| South Korea (Kim) 🔨 | 1 | 2 | 0 | 4 | 1 | 0 | 8 |
| Italy (Tabanelli) | 0 | 0 | 2 | 0 | 0 | 2 | 4 |

=== Draw 8 ===
Thursday, February 6, 10:00

| Sheet A | 1 | 2 | 3 | 4 | 5 | 6 | EE | Final |
| Canada (Austgarden) | 2 | 0 | 1 | 0 | 2 | 0 | 0 | 5 |
| South Korea (Kim) 🔨 | 0 | 1 | 0 | 1 | 0 | 3 | 1 | 6 |

| Sheet B | 1 | 2 | 3 | 4 | 5 | 6 | Final |
| Russia (Smirnov) | 1 | 1 | 0 | 0 | 0 | 0 | 2 |
| United States (Perez) 🔨 | 0 | 0 | 2 | 2 | 1 | 1 | 6 |

| Sheet C | 1 | 2 | 3 | 4 | 5 | 6 | Final |
| Japan (Nakajima) | 1 | 0 | 0 | 2 | 0 | 0 | 3 |
| Italy (Tabanelli) 🔨 | 0 | 1 | 1 | 0 | 4 | 2 | 8 |

| Sheet D | 1 | 2 | 3 | 4 | 5 | 6 | Final |
| Scotland (McCreadie) | 2 | 0 | 0 | 0 | 4 | 0 | 6 |
| Norway (Lorentsen) 🔨 | 0 | 1 | 4 | 3 | 0 | 1 | 9 |

| Sheet E | 1 | 2 | 3 | 4 | 5 | 6 | Final |
| Switzerland (Bolliger) 🔨 | 0 | 0 | 0 | 1 | 0 | X | 1 |
| Sweden (Jungnell) | 3 | 1 | 3 | 0 | 1 | X | 8 |

=== Draw 9 ===
Thursday, February 6, 15:30

| Sheet A | 1 | 2 | 3 | 4 | 5 | 6 | Final |
| Russia (Smirnov) | 2 | 0 | 1 | 1 | 0 | 1 | 5 |
| Italy (Tabanelli) 🔨 | 0 | 3 | 0 | 0 | 1 | 0 | 4 |

| Sheet B | 1 | 2 | 3 | 4 | 5 | 6 | EE | Final |
| South Korea (Kim) 🔨 | 1 | 0 | 1 | 1 | 0 | 0 | 0 | 3 |
| Norway (Lorentsen) | 0 | 1 | 0 | 0 | 1 | 1 | 2 | 5 |

| Sheet C | 1 | 2 | 3 | 4 | 5 | 6 | Final |
| United States (Perez) 🔨 | 3 | 1 | 3 | 0 | 0 | 2 | 9 |
| Switzerland (Bolliger) | 0 | 0 | 0 | 1 | 1 | 0 | 2 |

| Sheet D | 1 | 2 | 3 | 4 | 5 | 6 | Final |
| Japan (Nakajima) 🔨 | 1 | 0 | 5 | 0 | 0 | 2 | 8 |
| Sweden (Jungnell) | 0 | 2 | 0 | 1 | 3 | 0 | 6 |

| Sheet E | 1 | 2 | 3 | 4 | 5 | 6 | Final |
| Canada (Austgarden) | 0 | 1 | 0 | 0 | 0 | 1 | 2 |
| Scotland (McCreadie) 🔨 | 1 | 0 | 1 | 2 | 1 | 0 | 5 |

== Tiebreaker ==
Thursday, February 7, 13:30

| Sheet B | 1 | 2 | 3 | 4 | 5 | 6 | Final |
| Italy (Tabanelli) 🔨 | 2 | 1 | 0 | 0 | 1 | 0 | 4 |
| United States (Perez) | 0 | 0 | 1 | 3 | 0 | 2 | 6 |

== Playoffs ==
Page playoff system
1 | South Korea | 7
2 | Canada | 2
3 | Norway | 5
4 | United States | 3

Semifinal
2 | Canada | 5
3 | Norway | 6

Gold Medal Game
1 | South Korea | 3
3 | Norway | 5

| Bronze Medal Game |
| 2 | Canada | 1 |
| 4 | United States | 8 |

=== 1 vs. 2 Game ===
Friday, February 8, 10:00

| Sheet D | 1 | 2 | 3 | 4 | 5 | 6 | Final |
| South Korea (Kim) 🔨 | 2 | 0 | 1 | 0 | 4 | X | 7 |
| Canada (Austgarden) | 0 | 1 | 0 | 1 | 0 | X | 2 |

=== 3 vs. 4 Game ===
Friday, February 8, 10:00

| Sheet C | 1 | 2 | 3 | 4 | 5 | 6 | Final |
| Norway (Lorentsen) 🔨 | 0 | 3 | 0 | 1 | 0 | 1 | 5 |
| United States (Perez) | 1 | 0 | 1 | 0 | 1 | 0 | 3 |

=== Semifinal ===
Friday, February 8, 15:30

| Sheet E | 1 | 2 | 3 | 4 | 5 | 6 | Final |
| Canada (Austgarden) 🔨 | 3 | 0 | 1 | 1 | 0 | 0 | 5 |
| Norway (Lorentsen) | 0 | 2 | 0 | 0 | 2 | 2 | 6 |

=== Bronze medal game ===
Saturday, February 9, 10:00

| Sheet B | 1 | 2 | 3 | 4 | 5 | 6 | Final |
| Canada (Austgarden) 🔨 | 0 | 1 | 0 | 0 | 0 | X | 1 |
| United States (Perez) | 0 | 0 | 2 | 2 | 4 | X | 8 |

=== Gold medal game ===
Saturday, February 9, 11:00

| Sheet C | 1 | 2 | 3 | 4 | 5 | 6 | EE | Final |
| South Korea (Kim) 🔨 | 0 | 0 | 1 | 0 | 1 | 1 | 0 | 3 |
| Norway (Lorentsen) | 0 | 2 | 0 | 1 | 0 | 0 | 2 | 5 |

2008 World Wheelchair Curling Championship
(Norway)
Norway
2nd title
