= Saint-Christophe, Aosta Valley =

Saint-Christophe Sèn-Crétoublo (Valdôtain)
- Comune
- Comune di Saint-Christophe; Commune de Saint-Christophe
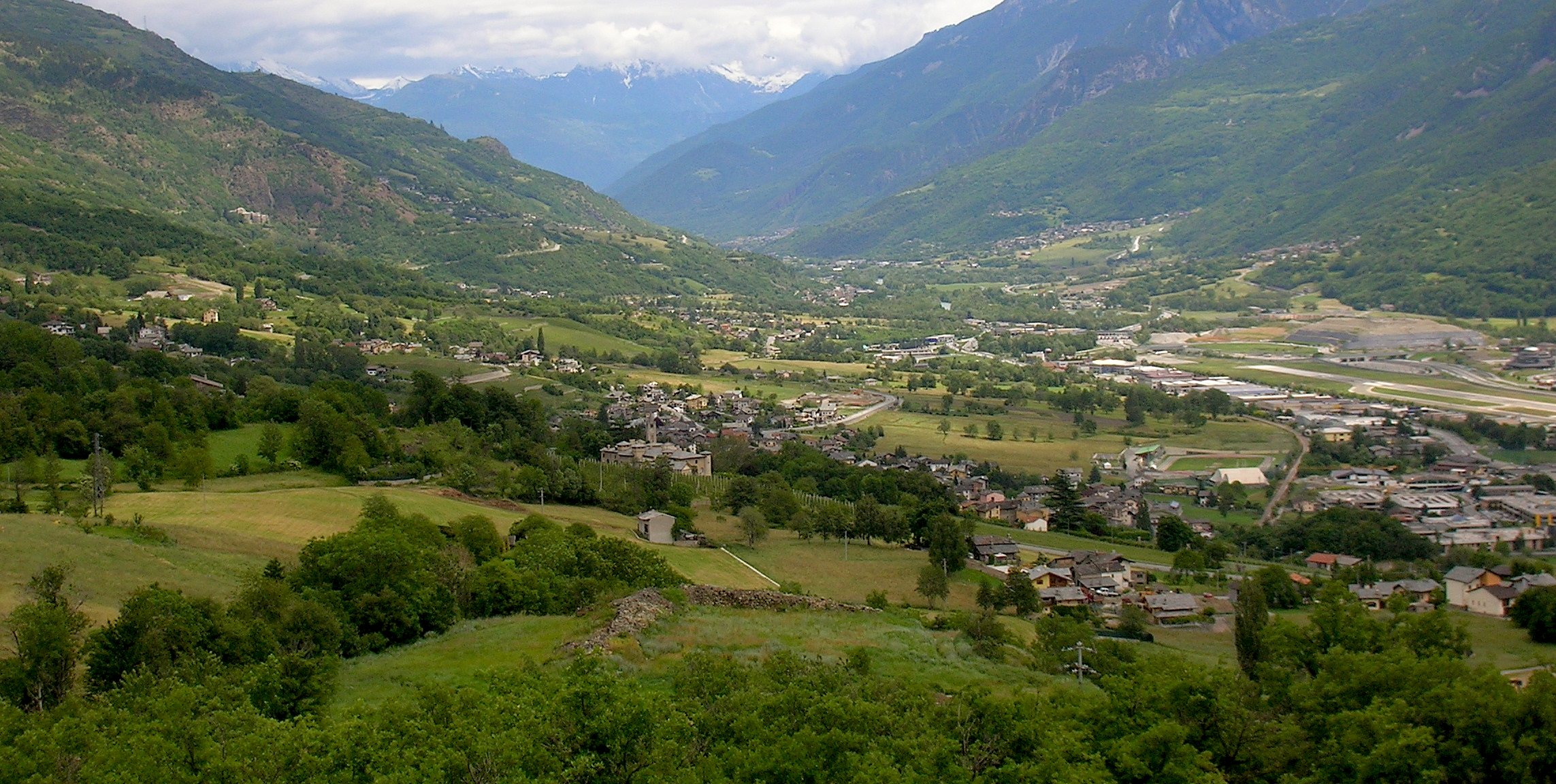

- Coat of arms

- Location within Italy Location within Aosta Valley
- Coordinates: 45°45′N 7°21′E
- Country: Italy
- Region: Aosta Valley
- Province: none
- Frazioni: Les Angelin, Bagnère, Bret, Cerisolaz, Chabloz, Champapon, Champ-d'Hône (Chandone), Château-d'Entrèves, Chaussod, La Cure, Chef-Lieu, Le Clappey, Cognon, Les Condémines, Les Îles, Cort, Coutateppaz, La Crétaz, La Croix-Noire, Les Croux, Les Étangs, Fontanalles, Frissonnière, Gallesio, Gérardin, Gevé, Le Grand-Chemin, La Grande-Charrière, La Grangère, Grin, Lemériaz, Le Lou (Loups), Maillod, La Maladière, Meysattaz, Nicolin, Pallein, Parléaz, La Péraz, Pin, Le Prévôt, Les Rouiyes, Senin, Senin, Sorreley, Le Thuvex, Valcorneille, Veynes, Vertolanaz

Government
  - Mayor: Paolo Cheney

Area
  - Total: 14 km^{2} (5.4 sq mi)
- Elevation: 619 m (2,031 ft)

Population (31 December 2022)
  - Total: 3,482
  - Density: 250/km^{2} (640/sq mi)
- Demonym: Saint-christopherins
- Time zone: UTC+1 (CET)
  - Summer (DST): UTC+2 (CEST)
- Postal code: 11020
- Dialing code: 0165
- Website: Official website

Saint-Christophe (French: [sɛ̃ kʁistɔf]; Valdôtain: Sèn-Crétoublo) is a town and comune in the Aosta Valley. It is located east of Aosta, on the left shore of the Dora Baltea.

== Landmarks ==
- Passerin d'Entrèves castle

== Transport ==
Aosta Valley Airport is located in Saint-Christophe, in Les-Îles.

== Sport ==
- École de Football Saint-Christophe

== Twinnings ==
- Bellegarde-sur-Valserine, France
