= Kang Mi-suk (curler) =

South Korean wheelchair curler

Personal information
- Nationality: South Korean
- Born: September 25, 1968 (age 58) South Korea

Sport
- Country: South Korea
- Sport: Wheelchair curling

Achievements and titles
- Paralympic finals: 1
- World finals: 2
Medal record
Wheelchair curling
Winter Paralympics
Silver medal – second place	2010 Vancouver
World Wheelchair Championship
Silver medal – second place	2008 Sursee
Silver medal – second place	2012 Chuncheon

Korean name
- Hangul: 강미숙
- RR: Gang Misuk
- MR: Kang Misuk

Kang Mi-suk (born September 25, 1968) is a wheelchair curler from South Korea, and is on the South Korean wheelchair curling team. Her lower part of the body was paralysed due to a blood vessel abnormality with unknown causes. She participated at the 2014 Winter Paralympics, and 2010 Winter Paralympics, winning a silver medal.
