= Katsuji Uchibori =

Japanese male curler and coach

- Curler ♂

Curling career
- Member Association: Japan
Medal record
Curling
Japanese Men's Curling Championship
Silver medal – second place	1998 Tokoro

Katsuji Uchibori is a Japanese male curler and coach.

At the national level, he is a 1998 Japanese men's championship silver medallist.

== Teams ==
Season	Skip	Third	Second	Lead	Alternate	Events
1997–98	Nagao Tsuchiya	Hideki Ogihara	Katsuji Uchibori	Yuki Inoue	Tamotsu Matsumura	JMCC 1998 (silver)
2014–15	Katsuji Uchibori	Mitsuhiro Furukoshi	Satoshi Kitada	Toshihide Kanie		

== Record as a coach of national teams ==
Year	Tournament, event	National team	Place
2009	2009 Winter Universiade	Japan (students women)	8
2010	2010 Winter Paralympics	Japan (wheelchair)	10
