= Kumiko Ogihara =

Japanese male curler and coach

- Curler ♂

Curling career
- Member Association: Japan
Medal record
Curling

Kumiko Ogihara is a Japanese male curler and coach.

== Record as a coach of national teams ==
Year	Tournament, event	National team	Place
2005	2005 World Wheelchair Curling Championship	Japan (wheelchair)	13
2006	2006 World Wheelchair Curling Qualification Competition	Japan (wheelchair)	2nd place, silver medalist(s)
2007	2007 World Wheelchair Curling Championship	Japan (wheelchair)	5
2008	2008 World Wheelchair Curling Championship	Japan (wheelchair)	9
