= Mauro Maino =

Italian male curler and coach

- Curler ♂
- Born: 20 June 1966 (age 60)

Curling career
- Member Association: Italy
Medal record
Curling

Mauro Maino (born 20 June 1966) is an Italian male curler and coach.

== Record as a coach of national teams ==
Year	Tournament, event	National team	Place
2002	2002 World Wheelchair Curling Championship	Italy (wheelchair)	8
2004	2004 World Wheelchair Curling Championship	Italy (wheelchair)	6
2005	2005 World Wheelchair Curling Championship	Italy (wheelchair)	9
2006	2006 World Wheelchair Curling Qualification Competition	Italy (wheelchair)	3rd place, bronze medalist(s)
2008	2008 World Wheelchair Curling Championship	Italy (wheelchair)	5
2009	2009 World Wheelchair Curling Championship	Italy (wheelchair)	9
2010	2010 Winter Paralympics	Italy (wheelchair)	5
