= Andrea Tabanelli (curler) =

Italian wheelchair curler (1961–2020)

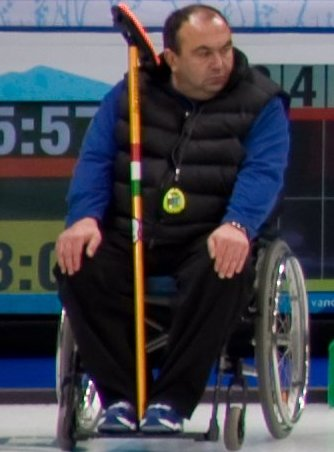

Personal information
- Nationality: Italian
- Born: 16 April 1961 Perugia, Italy
- Died: 27 October 2020 (aged 59) Courmayeur, Italy

Sport
- Country: Italy
- Sport: Wheelchair curling

Andrea Tabanelli (16 April 1961 – 27 October 2020) was an Italian wheelchair curler.

Tabanelli died on 27 October 2020 at the age of 59.

== Biography ==
Tabanelli was born in Perugia. He was a member (third) of the Italian wheelchair curling team at the 2006 Winter Paralympics in Torino. He was the skip of the Italian team at the 2010 Winter Paralympics in Vancouver.
