= Preben Nielsen =

Danish wheelchair curler

- Curler ♂

Team
- Curling club: Tårnby CC, Tårnby

Curling career
- Member Association: Denmark
- World Wheelchair Championship: 1 (2002)
Medal record
Wheelchair curling

Preben Granhøj Nielsen is a Danish wheelchair curler.

== Teams ==
Season	Skip	Third	Second	Lead	Alternate	Coach	Events
2001–02	Preben Nielsen	Lars Enemark	Kasper Poulsen	Rosita Jensen	Henrik Petersen	Finn Mikkelsen	WWhCC 2002 (9th)
2011–12	Kenneth Ørbæk	Henrik Harlev Petersen	Preben Nielsen	Rosita Jensen	Sussie Nielsen	Per Christensen	WWhCQ 2011 (6th)
2012–13	Kenneth Ørbæk (fourth)	Preben Nielsen (skip)	Rosita Jensen	Henrik Harlev Petersen	Thomas Pedersen	Per Christensen	WWhCQ 2012 (9th)
2014–15	Preben Granhøj Nielsen	Henrik Harlev Petersen	Helena Skovgaard	Rene Graff		Per Christensen	WWhCQ 2014 (9th)
