= Kenneth Ørbæk =

Swiss wheelchair curler and Paralympian

- Curler ♂
- Born: 18 August 1960 (age 66)

Team
- Curling club: Tårnby CC, Tårnby

Curling career
- Member Association: Denmark
- World Wheelchair Championship: 3 (2004, 2005, 2007)
- World Wheelchair Mixed Doubles Championship: 3 (2022, 2024, 2025)
- Paralympic: 1 (2006)
Medal record
Wheelchair curling
World Wheelchair Championship
Silver medal – second place	2005 Glasgow

Kenneth Ørbæk (born 18 August 1960) is a Danish wheelchair curler.

He participated in the 2006 Winter Paralympics where Danish team finished on fifth place.

== Teams ==
Season	Skip	Third	Second	Lead	Alternate	Coach	Events
2003–04	Kenneth Ørbæk	Jørn Kristensen	Rosita Jensen	Bjarne Jensen	Pernille Pirchert	Per Christensen	WWhCC 2004 (8th)
2004–05	Kenneth Ørbæk	Rosita Jensen	Jørn Kristensen	Bjarne Jensen	Sussie Pedersen	Per Christensen	WWhCC 2005 (silver)
2005–06	Kenneth Ørbæk	Rosita Jensen	Jørn Kristensen	Sussie Pedersen	Bjarne Jensen		WPG 2006 (5th)
2006–07	Kenneth Ørbæk	Sussie Pedersen	Jørn Kristensen	Ingerlise Jensen	Bjarne Jensen	Per Christensen	WWhCC 2007 (9th)
2007–08	Kenneth Ørbæk	Jørn Kristensen	Sussie Pedersen	Rosita Jensen	Bjarne Jensen		WWhCQ 2007 (bronze)
2008–09	Kenneth Ørbæk	Jørn Kristensen	Rosita Jensen	Lars Enemark	Robert Fezerskov Hansen	Per Christensen	WWhCQ 2008 (5th)
2010–11	Kenneth Ørbæk	Jørn Kristensen	Rosita Jensen	Robert Fezerskov Hansen		Per Christensen	WWhCQ 2010 (7th)
2011–12	Kenneth Ørbæk	Henrik Harlev Petersen	Preben Nielsen	Rosita Jensen	Sussie Nielsen	Per Christensen	WWhCQ 2011 (6th)
2012–13	Kenneth Ørbæk (fourth)	Preben Nielsen (skip)	Rosita Jensen	Henrik Harlev Petersen	Thomas Pedersen	Per Christensen	WWhCQ 2012 (9th)
2015–16	Kenneth Ørbæk	Jørn Kristensen	Helle Christiansen	Christian Richardson	Carsten Hansen	Per Christensen	WWhBCC 2015 (8th)
2016–17	Kenneth Ørbæk	Helle Christiansen	Carsten Hansen	Jack Brendle	Tove Hoey	Jorgen Hoj	WWhBCC 2016 (13th)
2018–19	Kenneth Ørbæk	Helle Christiansen	Jack Brendle	Michaell Jensen	Kirsten Behrensdorff	Per Christensen	WWhBCC 2018 (10th)
2019–20	Kenneth Ørbæk	Helle Christiansen	Jack Brendle	Michaell Jensen	Sussie Nielsen	Per Christensen	WWhBCC 2019 (8th)

=== Mixed doubles ===
Season	Female	Male	Coach	Events
2021–22	Sussie Nielsen	Kenneth Ørbæk	Kasper Wiksten	WWhMDCC 2022 (12th)
2024–25	Helle Christiansen-Schmidt	Kenneth Ørbæk	Kasper Wiksten	WWhMDCC 2025 (15th)
