= Bjarne Jensen (curler) =

Danish wheelchair curler and Paralympian (born 1956)

- Curler ♂
- Born: 14 April 1956 (age 70); Haslev Municipality

Team
- Curling club: Tårnby CC, Tårnby

Curling career
- Member Association: Denmark
- World Wheelchair Championship: 3 (2004, 2005, 2007)
- Paralympic: 1 (2006)
Medal record
Wheelchair curling
World Wheelchair Championship
Silver medal – second place	2005 Glasgow

Bjarne Jensen (born 14 April 1956 in Haslev Municipality) is a Danish wheelchair curler.

He participated in the 2006 Winter Paralympics where Danish team finished on fifth place.

== Teams ==
Season	Skip	Third	Second	Lead	Alternate	Coach	Events
2003–04	Kenneth Ørbæk	Jørn Kristensen	Rosita Jensen	Bjarne Jensen	Pernille Pirchert	Per Christensen	WWhCC 2004 (8th)
2004–05	Kenneth Ørbæk	Rosita Jensen	Jørn Kristensen	Bjarne Jensen	Sussie Pedersen	Per Christensen	WWhCC 2005 (silver)
2005–06	Kenneth Ørbæk	Rosita Jensen	Jørn Kristensen	Sussie Pedersen	Bjarne Jensen		WPG 2006 (5th)
2006–07	Kenneth Ørbæk	Sussie Pedersen	Jørn Kristensen	Ingerlise Jensen	Bjarne Jensen	Per Christensen	WWhCC 2007 (9th)
2007–08	Kenneth Ørbæk	Jørn Kristensen	Sussie Pedersen	Rosita Jensen	Bjarne Jensen		WWhCQ 2007 (bronze)
