= Jørn Kristensen =

Swiss wheelchair curler and Paralympian

- Curler ♂
- Born: 11 June 1957 (age 69); Skjern Municipality, Denmark

Team
- Curling club: Tårnby CC, Tårnby

Curling career
- Member Association: Denmark
- World Wheelchair Championship: 3 (2004, 2005, 2007)
- Paralympic: 1 (2006)
Medal record
Wheelchair curling
World Wheelchair Championship
Silver medal – second place	2005 Glasgow

Jørn Kristensen (born 11 June 1957) is a Danish wheelchair curler.

He participated in the 2006 Winter Paralympics where Danish team finished on fifth place.

== Teams ==
Season	Skip	Third	Second	Lead	Alternate	Coach	Events
2003–04	Kenneth Ørbæk	Jørn Kristensen	Rosita Jensen	Bjarne Jensen	Pernille Pirchert	Per Christensen	WWhCC 2004 (8th)
2004–05	Kenneth Ørbæk	Rosita Jensen	Jørn Kristensen	Bjarne Jensen	Sussie Pedersen	Per Christensen	WWhCC 2005 (silver)
2005–06	Kenneth Ørbæk	Rosita Jensen	Jørn Kristensen	Sussie Pedersen	Bjarne Jensen		WPG 2006 (5th)
2006–07	Kenneth Ørbæk	Sussie Pedersen	Jørn Kristensen	Ingerlise Jensen	Bjarne Jensen	Per Christensen	WWhCC 2007 (9th)
2007–08	Kenneth Ørbæk	Jørn Kristensen	Sussie Pedersen	Rosita Jensen	Bjarne Jensen		WWhCQ 2007 (bronze)
2008–09	Kenneth Ørbæk	Jørn Kristensen	Rosita Jensen	Lars Enemark	Robert Fezerskov Hansen	Per Christensen	WWhCQ 2008 (5th)
2010–11	Kenneth Ørbæk	Jørn Kristensen	Rosita Jensen	Robert Fezerskov Hansen		Per Christensen	WWhCQ 2010 (7th)
2015–16	Kenneth Ørbæk	Jørn Kristensen	Helle Christiansen	Christian Richardson	Carsten Hansen	Per Christensen	WWhBCC 2015 (8th)
