= Rosita Jensen =

Danish wheelchair curler and Paralympian

- Curler ♀
- Other names: Ingerlise Rosita Jensen
- Born: 9 May 1951 (age 75); Copenhagen

Team
- Curling club: Tårnby CC, Tårnby

Curling career
- Member Association: Denmark
- World Wheelchair Championship: 4 (2002, 2004, 2005, 2007)
- Paralympic: 1 (2006)
Medal record
Wheelchair curling
World Wheelchair Championship
Silver medal – second place	2005 Glasgow

Ingerlise Rosita Jensen (born 9 May 1951 in Copenhagen) is a Danish wheelchair curler.

She participated in the 2006 Winter Paralympics where Danish team finished on fifth place.

== Teams ==
Season	Skip	Third	Second	Lead	Alternate	Coach	Events
2001–02	Preben Nielsen	Lars Enemark	Kasper Poulsen	Rosita Jensen	Henrik Petersen	Finn Mikkelsen	WWhCC 2002 (9th)
2003–04	Kenneth Ørbæk	Jørn Kristensen	Rosita Jensen	Bjarne Jensen	Pernille Pirchert	Per Christensen	WWhCC 2004 (8th)
2004–05	Kenneth Ørbæk	Rosita Jensen	Jørn Kristensen	Bjarne Jensen	Sussie Pedersen	Per Christensen	WWhCC 2005 (silver)
2005–06	Kenneth Ørbæk	Rosita Jensen	Jørn Kristensen	Sussie Pedersen	Bjarne Jensen		WPG 2006 (5th)
2006–07	Kenneth Ørbæk	Sussie Pedersen	Jørn Kristensen	Ingerlise Jensen	Bjarne Jensen	Per Christensen	WWhCC 2007 (9th)
2007–08	Kenneth Ørbæk	Jørn Kristensen	Sussie Pedersen	Rosita Jensen	Bjarne Jensen		WWhCQ 2007 (bronze)
2008–09	Kenneth Ørbæk	Jørn Kristensen	Rosita Jensen	Lars Enemark	Robert Fezerskov Hansen	Per Christensen	WWhCQ 2008 (5th)
2010–11	Kenneth Ørbæk	Jørn Kristensen	Rosita Jensen	Robert Fezerskov Hansen		Per Christensen	WWhCQ 2010 (7th)
2011–12	Kenneth Ørbæk	Henrik Harlev Petersen	Preben Nielsen	Rosita Jensen	Sussie Nielsen	Per Christensen	WWhCQ 2011 (6th)
2012–13	Kenneth Ørbæk (fourth)	Preben Nielsen (skip)	Rosita Jensen	Henrik Harlev Petersen	Thomas Pedersen	Per Christensen	WWhCQ 2012 (9th)
