= 2019 World Wheelchair-B Curling Championship =

- Host city: Lohja, Finland
- Arena: Kisakallio Sports Institute
- Dates: November 27 – December 2
- Winner: Canada
- Skip: Mark Ideson
- Fourth: Jon Thurston
- Third: Ina Forrest
- Second: Marie Wright
- Alternate: Dennis Thiessen
- Coach: Wayne Kiel
- Finalist: Sweden (Petersson-Dahl)

The 2019 World Wheelchair-B Curling Championship were held from November 27 to December 2 in Lohja, Finland. The championship was used to qualify three teams for the 2020 World Wheelchair Curling Championship in Wetzikon, Switzerland.

In the final, Canada defeated Sweden by a score of 6-1. This meant Canada, Sweden and bronze medal winners Czech Republic all qualified for the 2020 World Championships.

== Teams ==
Canada	Czech Republic	Denmark	England
Fourth: Jon Thurston; Third: Ina Forrest; Second: Marie Wright; Skip: Mark Ideson; Alternate: Dennis Thiessen; Coach: Wayne Kiel	Fourth: Radek Musílek; Skip: Dana Selnekovičová; Second: Martin Tluk; Lead: Jana Břinčilová; Alternate: Štěpán Beneš; Coach: Helena Barkmanova, Kateřina Urbanová	Skip: Kenneth Ørbæk; Third: Helle Christiansen; Second: Jack Brendle; Lead: Michael Jensen; Alternate: Sussie Nielsen; Coach: Per Christensen	Fourth: Stewart Pimblett; Skip: Rosemary Lenton; Second: Edward Bidgood; Lead: Paul Simmons; Coach: Tony Lenton
Finland	Germany	Hungary	Italy
Fourth: Harri Tuomaala; Skip: Juha Rajala; Second: Teemu Klasila; Lead: Riitta Särösalo; Alternate: Pekka Pälsynaho; Coach: Vesa Kokko	Skip: Christiane Putzich; Third: Burkhard Möller; Second: Wolf Meissner; Lead: Heike Melchior; Alternate: Melanie Spielmann; Coach: Helmar Erlewein, Jamie Boutin	Fourth: Péter Barkóczi; Skip: Viktor Beke; Second: Anikó Sasadi; Lead: Rita Sárai; Coach: Olivér Kerekes	Fourth: Egidio Marchese; Skip: Paolo Ioriatti; Second: Gabriele Dallapiccola; Lead: Angela Menardi; Alternate: Orietta Berto; Coach: Violetta Caldart, Amanda Bianchi
Japan	Lithuania	Poland	Slovenia
Skip: Takashi Sakataya; Third: Kazuhiro Kashiwabara; Second: Tsutomu Iwata; Lead: Kana Matsuda; Alternate: Hiromi Takahashi; Coach: Tsutomu Kobayashi, Hiroya Sato	Skip: Andrej Daškevič; Third: Jurij Savickij; Second: Jevgenijus Pyževskis; Lead: Reda Pociūtė; Coach: Arnis Veidemanis	Fourth: Antoni Pardo; Third: Mariusz Włodarski; Skip: Michał Daszkowski; Lead: Joanna Kozakiewicz; Alternate: Łukasz Waszek; Coach: Jeremi Telak	Fourth: Robert Žerovnik; Skip: Žiga Bajde; Second: Jože Klemen; Lead: Jovita Jeglič; Coach: Gregor Verbinc
Sweden	Turkey	United States	
Skip: Viljo Petersson-Dahl; Third: Mats-Ola Engborg; Second: Ronny Persson; Lead: Kristina Ulander; Alternate: Zandra Reppe; Coach: Alison Kreviazuk, Peter Narup	Fourth: Züleyha Bingöl; Third: Kenan Coşkun; Second: Turan Akalın; Skip: Savaş Şimşek; Alternate: Deren Özgen; Coach: Gökçe Ulugay, Soner Doğan	Skip: Stephen Emt; Third: Matthew Thums; Second: David Samsa; Lead: Meghan Lino; Alternate: Pamela Wilson; Coach: Rusty Schieber	

== Round-robin standings ==
Final round-robin standings

Key
Teams to Playoffs

Group A	Skip	W	L	W–L
Canada	Mark Ideson	5	1	–
Italy	Paolo Ioriatti	4	2	1–0
Sweden	Viljo Petersson-Dahl	4	2	0–1
Turkey	Savaş Şimşek	3	3	1–0
Finland	Juha Rajala	3	3	0–1
Japan	Takashi Sakataya	2	4	–
Poland	Michał Daszkowski	0	6	–

Group B	Skip	W	L	W–L
Slovenia	Žiga Bajde	6	1	1–0
Germany	Christiane Putzich	6	1	0–1
Czech Republic	Dana Selnekovičová	5	2	–
Denmark	Kenneth Oerbaek	3	4	1–0
England	Rosemary Lenton	3	4	0–1
United States	Stephen Emt	2	5	1–0
Lithuania	Andrej Daškevič	2	5	0–1
Hungary	Viktor Beke	1	6	–

== Round-robin results ==
All draws are listed in Eastern European Time (UTC+02:00).

=== Draw 1 ===
Wednesday, November 27, 16:30

Sheet A	1	2	3	4	5	6	7	8	Final
Poland	0	0	1	1	1	1	0	0	4
Turkey 🔨	3	1	0	0	0	0	2	2	8

Sheet B	1	2	3	4	5	6	7	8	Final
Finland	0	2	1	2	0	1	0	0	6
Sweden 🔨	1	0	0	0	2	0	2	2	7

Sheet C	1	2	3	4	5	6	7	8	Final
Canada 🔨	1	0	2	0	3	0	5	X	11
Italy	0	1	0	1	0	1	0	X	3

=== Draw 2 ===
Wednesday, November 27, 20:00

Sheet A	1	2	3	4	5	6	7	8	Final
England 🔨	0	1	0	0	1	0	0	X	2
Lithuania	1	0	1	2	0	2	4	X	10

Sheet B	1	2	3	4	5	6	7	8	Final
Czech Republic 🔨	0	0	3	1	3	0	0	0	7
United States	0	1	0	0	0	3	1	1	6

Sheet C	1	2	3	4	5	6	7	8	Final
Denmark 🔨	0	0	0	1	0	0	1	1	3
Slovenia	1	2	1	0	0	2	0	0	6

Sheet D	1	2	3	4	5	6	7	8	Final
Hungary 🔨	5	0	1	0	0	0	0	0	6
Germany	0	2	0	2	2	3	1	2	12

=== Draw 3 ===
Thursday, November 28, 08:30

Sheet B	1	2	3	4	5	6	7	8	Final
Italy 🔨	5	0	0	2	0	0	2	0	9
Japan	0	3	2	0	2	4	0	2	13

Sheet C	1	2	3	4	5	6	7	8	Final
Turkey	2	1	0	3	0	2	0	X	8
Sweden 🔨	0	0	5	0	3	0	4	X	12

Sheet D	1	2	3	4	5	6	7	8	Final
Poland 🔨	0	0	0	0	0	0	X	X	0
Finland	1	3	2	1	1	4	X	X	12

=== Draw 4 ===
Thursday, November 28, 12:00

Sheet A	1	2	3	4	5	6	7	8	Final
Slovenia	1	1	0	4	0	1	1	X	8
Germany 🔨	0	0	3	0	1	0	0	X	4

Sheet B	1	2	3	4	5	6	7	8	Final
Denmark 🔨	0	2	1	1	0	2	0	1	7
Hungary	1	0	0	0	2	0	2	0	5

Sheet C	1	2	3	4	5	6	7	8	Final
Lithuania 🔨	1	0	0	1	0	1	X	X	3
United States	0	6	2	0	2	0	X	X	10

Sheet D	1	2	3	4	5	6	7	8	Final
England	1	0	0	1	2	0	4	X	8
Czech Republic 🔨	0	1	1	0	0	2	0	X	4

=== Draw 5 ===
Thursday, November 28, 15:30

Sheet A	1	2	3	4	5	6	7	8	9	Final
Italy 🔨	0	4	1	0	0	0	3	0	1	9
Sweden	1	0	0	2	3	1	0	1	0	8

Sheet C	1	2	3	4	5	6	7	8	Final
Japan	0	1	1	0	2	0	0	0	4
Finland 🔨	1	0	0	1	0	1	1	1	5

Sheet D	1	2	3	4	5	6	7	8	Final
Turkey 🔨	1	2	0	0	0	0	X	X	3
Canada	0	0	4	1	3	2	X	X	10

=== Draw 6 ===
Thursday, November 28, 19:00

Sheet A	1	2	3	4	5	6	7	8	Final
Denmark	1	1	1	0	1	0	2	1	7
United States 🔨	0	0	0	3	0	1	0	0	4

Sheet B	1	2	3	4	5	6	7	8	Final
England 🔨	3	0	0	0	1	0	3	X	7
Germany	0	2	1	3	0	4	0	X	10

Sheet C	1	2	3	4	5	6	7	8	Final
Hungary	0	1	0	0	0	0	X	X	1
Czech Republic 🔨	3	0	3	1	2	3	X	X	12

Sheet D	1	2	3	4	5	6	7	8	Final
Lithuania 🔨	0	0	0	0	1	2	0	X	3
Slovenia	2	2	2	1	0	0	2	X	9

=== Draw 7 ===
Friday, November 29, 09:30

Sheet A	1	2	3	4	5	6	7	8	Final
Finland	0	0	1	1	0	1	3	0	6
Canada 🔨	2	0	0	0	1	0	0	1	4

Sheet B	1	2	3	4	5	6	7	8	Final
Japan	0	1	0	0	3	0	0	2	6
Turkey 🔨	2	0	3	1	0	1	1	0	8

Sheet C	1	2	3	4	5	6	7	8	Final
Poland	0	1	1	0	2	0	1	X	5
Italy 🔨	2	0	0	4	0	1	0	X	7

=== Draw 8 ===
Friday, November 29, 14:30

Sheet A	1	2	3	4	5	6	7	8	Final
Czech Republic	0	0	0	5	0	1	1	1	8
Slovenia 🔨	1	3	2	0	1	0	0	0	7

Sheet B	1	2	3	4	5	6	7	8	Final
Hungary 🔨	3	1	0	2	0	0	2	1	9
Lithuania	0	0	1	0	2	2	0	0	5

Sheet C	1	2	3	4	5	6	7	8	Final
England 🔨	1	1	0	0	2	0	2	0	6
Denmark	0	0	1	2	0	1	0	3	7

Sheet D	1	2	3	4	5	6	7	8	Final
Germany 🔨	4	2	2	1	1	2	X	X	12
United States	0	0	0	0	0	0	X	X	0

=== Draw 9 ===
Friday, November 29, 18:30

Sheet A	1	2	3	4	5	6	7	8	Final
Japan	2	0	1	2	1	1	X	X	7
Poland 🔨	0	1	0	0	0	0	X	X	1

Sheet B	1	2	3	4	5	6	7	8	Final
Sweden	0	1	2	0	0	2	0	0	5
Canada 🔨	3	0	0	1	0	0	2	1	7

Sheet D	1	2	3	4	5	6	7	8	Final
Italy 🔨	3	2	0	3	1	1	X	X	10
Turkey	0	0	1	0	0	0	X	X	1

=== Draw 10 ===
Saturday, November 30, 08:30

Sheet A	1	2	3	4	5	6	7	8	Final
Hungary 🔨	0	0	0	0	1	2	0	X	3
England	3	2	2	1	0	0	2	X	10

Sheet B	1	2	3	4	5	6	7	8	Final
United States	0	0	1	0	1	0	0	X	2
Slovenia 🔨	1	1	0	1	0	1	2	X	6

Sheet C	1	2	3	4	5	6	7	8	Final
Czech Republic 🔨	1	1	0	1	0	0	0	X	3
Germany	0	0	2	0	3	2	1	X	8

Sheet D	1	2	3	4	5	6	7	8	Final
Denmark 🔨	2	0	0	0	0	0	0	X	2
Lithuania	0	3	1	1	2	1	1	X	9

=== Draw 11 ===
Saturday, November 30, 12:00

Sheet A	1	2	3	4	5	6	7	8	Final
Turkey	0	1	0	3	2	1	1	X	8
Finland 🔨	1	0	1	0	0	0	0	X	2

Sheet C	1	2	3	4	5	6	7	8	Final
Sweden	2	3	1	2	0	0	X	X	8
Poland 🔨	0	0	0	0	1	1	X	X	2

Sheet D	1	2	3	4	5	6	7	8	Final
Canada 🔨	4	0	2	0	2	3	X	X	11
Japan	0	0	0	3	0	0	X	X	3

=== Draw 12 ===
Saturday, November 30, 15:30

Sheet A	1	2	3	4	5	6	7	8	Final
Lithuania 🔨	0	0	2	0	1	0	X	X	3
Czech Republic	3	1	0	3	0	3	X	X	10

Sheet B	1	2	3	4	5	6	7	8	Final
Germany	2	1	0	4	1	0	0	X	8
Denmark 🔨	0	0	1	0	0	1	1	X	3

Sheet C	1	2	3	4	5	6	7	8	Final
United States 🔨	1	0	0	0	0	0	1	X	2
England	0	1	3	1	1	2	0	X	8

Sheet D	1	2	3	4	5	6	7	8	Final
Slovenia	3	2	1	1	1	1	0	X	9
Hungary 🔨	0	0	0	0	0	0	2	X	2

=== Draw 13 ===
Saturday, November 30, 19:00

Sheet A	1	2	3	4	5	6	7	8	Final
Sweden	0	1	0	2	1	0	3	X	7
Japan 🔨	0	0	2	0	0	1	0	X	3

Sheet B	1	2	3	4	5	6	7	8	Final
Canada 🔨	2	3	0	7	0	4	X	X	16
Poland	0	0	1	0	2	0	X	X	3

Sheet D	1	2	3	4	5	6	7	8	Final
Finland	0	0	1	2	0	5	0	0	8
Italy 🔨	1	2	0	0	2	0	1	3	9

=== Draw 14 ===
Sunday, December 1, 09:30

Sheet A	1	2	3	4	5	6	7	8	Final
United States 🔨	1	0	3	0	4	2	0	X	10
Hungary	0	1	0	2	0	0	1	X	4

Sheet B	1	2	3	4	5	6	7	8	Final
Slovenia	0	2	1	0	1	0	0	3	7
England 🔨	1	0	0	2	0	2	1	0	6

Sheet C	1	2	3	4	5	6	7	8	Final
Germany 🔨	1	0	4	2	0	4	X	X	11
Lithuania	0	1	0	0	2	0	X	X	3

Sheet D	1	2	3	4	5	6	7	8	Final
Czech Republic 🔨	1	3	0	0	0	3	0	2	9
Denmark	0	0	1	0	3	0	2	0	6

== Playoffs ==
Qualification games
A2	Italy	2
B3	Czech Republic	8
B2	Germany	2
A3	Sweden	8

Semifinals
A1	Canada	10
B3	Czech Republic	4
B1	Slovenia	5
A3	Sweden	7

Final
A1	Canada	6
A3	Sweden	1
Bronze medal game
B3	Czech Republic	10
B1	Slovenia	7

5th place game
A2	Italy	9
B2	Germany	2

=== Qualification games ===
Sunday, December 1, 18:00

Sheet A	1	2	3	4	5	6	7	8	Final
Germany 🔨	1	0	0	0	0	1	0	X	2
Sweden	0	0	1	4	2	0	1	X	8

Sheet C	1	2	3	4	5	6	7	8	Final
Italy 🔨	0	0	2	0	0	0	0	X	2
Czech Republic	1	1	0	1	1	1	3	X	8

=== 5th place game ===
Monday, December 2, 09:00

Sheet D	1	2	3	4	5	6	7	8	Final
Italy 🔨	3	0	1	3	0	1	1	X	9
Germany	0	1	0	0	1	0	0	X	2

=== Semifinals ===
Monday, December 2, 09:00

Sheet B	1	2	3	4	5	6	7	8	Final
Slovenia 🔨	1	0	0	2	1	0	1	X	5
Sweden	0	2	2	0	0	3	0	X	7

Sheet D	1	2	3	4	5	6	7	8	Final
Canada 🔨	0	3	3	1	0	3	0	X	10
Czech Republic	2	0	0	0	1	0	1	X	4

=== Bronze medal game ===
Monday, December 2, 14:30

Sheet C	1	2	3	4	5	6	7	8	Final
Czech Republic	2	0	1	0	5	0	0	2	10
Slovenia 🔨	0	3	0	2	0	1	1	0	7

=== Final ===
Monday, December 2, 14:30

Sheet A	1	2	3	4	5	6	7	8	Final
Canada 🔨	0	3	1	0	1	0	1	X	6
Sweden	0	0	0	1	0	0	0	X	1

== See also ==
- 2019 World Wheelchair Curling Championship
