= Christiane Putzich =

German wheelchair curler and Paralympian

- Curler ♀
- Born: Christiane Steger; 20 November 1975 (age 50); Hofgeismar, West Germany

Team
- Curling club: CC Schwenningen, Villingen-Schwenningen, Baden Hills Golf & Curling Club, CC Füssen, Füssen

Curling career
- Member Association: Germany
- World Wheelchair Championship: 5 (2011, 2015, 2016, 2017, 2019)
- Paralympic: 2 (2010, 2018)

Christiane "Nane" Putzich (born 20 November 1975 in Hofgeismar as Christiane Steger) is a German wheelchair curler.

She participated in the 2010 and 2018 Winter Paralympics where German wheelchair curling team finished on eighth place both times.

== Teams ==
Season	Skip	Third	Second	Lead	Alternate	Coach	Events
2009–10	Jens Jäger	Marcus Sieger	Jens Gäbel	Christiane Steger	Astrid Hoer	Helmar Erlewein	WPG 2010 (8th)
2010–11	Jens Gäbel (fourth)	Marcus Sieger (skip)	Stefan Deuschl	Christiane Steger	Heike Melchior	Helmar Erlewein	WWhCC 2011 (9th)
2012–13	Jens Jäger	Caren Totzauer	Martin Schlitt	Uwe Raschke	Christiane Steger	Bernd Weisser	WWhCQ 2012 (6th)
2014–15	Jens Jäger	Christiane Putzich	Martin Schlitt	Heike Melchior	Robert Hering	Bernd Weisser	WWhCQ 2014 (silver); WWhCC 2015 (7th)
2015–16	Jens Jäger	Christiane Putzich	Martin Schlitt	Heike Melchior	Harry Pavel	Bernd Weisser	WWhCC 2016 (8th)
2016–17	Christiane Putzich	Harry Pavel	Martin Schlitt	Heike Melchior	Christoph Gemmer	Bernd Weisser	WWhCC 2017 (9th)
2017–18	Christiane Putzich	Harry Pavel	Martin Schlitt	Heike Melchior	Wolf Meissner	Katja Schweizer	WPG 2018 (8th)
2018–19	Christiane Putzich	Harry Pavel	Wolf Meissner	Heike Melchior	Melanie Kurth	Helmar Erlewein, Jamie Boutin	WWhCC 2019 (12th)
2019–20	Christiane Putzich	Burkhard Moeller	Wolf Meissner	Heike Melchior	Melanie Spielmann	Helmar Erlewein, Jamie Boutin	WhBCC 2019 (6th)

=== Mixed doubles ===
Season	Female	Male	Coach	Events
2021–22	Christiane Putzich	Burkhard Moeller	Jamie Boutin	WWhMDCC 2022 (9th)
