= Caren Totzauer =

German wheelchair curler

- Curler ♀

Curling career
- Member Association: Germany
- World Wheelchair Championship: 1 (2009)
Medal record
Wheelchair curling
World Championship
| Bronze medal – third place | 2009 Vancouver |

Caren Totzauer is a German wheelchair curler.

At the international level, she is a 2009 World wheelchair bronze medallist.

== Teams ==
| Season | Skip | Third | Second | Lead | Alternate | Coach | Events |
|---|---|---|---|---|---|---|---|
| 2008–09 | Jens Jäger | Marcus Sieger | Jens Gäbel | Caren Totzauer | Astrid Hoer | Helmar Erlewein (WWhCC) | WWhCQ 2008 (gold); WWhCC 2009 (bronze) |
| 2011–12 | Jens Jäger | Caren Totzauer | Martin Schlitt | Uwe Raschke | Heike Melchior | Bernd Weisser | WWhCQ 2011 (4th) |
| 2012–13 | Jens Jäger | Caren Totzauer | Martin Schlitt | Uwe Raschke | Christiane Steger | Bernd Weisser | WWhCQ 2012 (6th) |
