= Heike Melchior =

German wheelchair curler and Paralympian

- Curler ♀
- Born: 18 August 1967 (age 59); Frankfurt

Team
- Curling club: Eintracht Frankfurt e.V., RSC Frankfurt

Curling career
- Member Association: Germany
- World Wheelchair Championship: 5 (2011, 2015, 2016, 2017, 2019)
- Paralympic: 1 (2018)

Heike Melchior (born 18 August 1967 in Frankfurt) is a German wheelchair curler.

She participated in the 2018 Winter Paralympics where German wheelchair curling team finished on eighth place.

== Teams ==
Season	Skip	Third	Second	Lead	Alternate	Coach	Events
2010–11	Jens Gäbel (fourth)	Marcus Sieger (skip)	Stefan Deuschl	Christiane Steger	Heike Melchior	Helmar Erlewein	WWhCC 2011 (9th)
2011–12	Jens Jäger	Caren Totzauer	Martin Schlitt	Uwe Raschke	Heike Melchior	Bernd Weisser	WWhCQ 2011 (4th)
2014–15	Jens Jäger	Christiane Putzich	Martin Schlitt	Heike Melchior	Robert Hering	Bernd Weisser	WWhCQ 2014 (silver); WWhCC 2015 (7th)
2015–16	Jens Jäger	Christiane Putzich	Martin Schlitt	Heike Melchior	Harry Pavel	Bernd Weisser	WWhCC 2016 (8th)
2016–17	Christiane Putzich	Harry Pavel	Martin Schlitt	Heike Melchior	Christoph Gemmer	Bernd Weisser	WWhCC 2017 (9th)
2017–18	Christiane Putzich	Harry Pavel	Martin Schlitt	Heike Melchior	Wolf Meissner	Katja Schweizer	WPG 2018 (8th)
2018–19	Christiane Putzich	Harry Pavel	Wolf Meissner	Heike Melchior	Melanie Kurth	Helmar Erlewein, Jamie Boutin	WWhCC 2019 (12th)
2019–20	Christiane Putzich	Burkhard Moeller	Wolf Meissner	Heike Melchior	Melanie Spielmann	Helmar Erlewein, Jamie Boutin	WhBCC 2019 (6th)
