= Jens Jäger =

German wheelchair curler and Paralympian (born 1963)

- Curler ♂
- Born: 4 November 1963 (age 63); Rottweil, West Germany

Team
- Curling club: CC Schwenningen, Villingen-Schwenningen

Curling career
- Member Association: Germany
- World Wheelchair Championship: 4 (2005, 2009, 2015, 2016)
- Paralympic: 1 (2010)
Medal record
Wheelchair curling
World Championship
Bronze medal – third place	2009 Vancouver

Jens Jäger (born 4 November 1963 in Rottweil) is a German wheelchair curler.

He participated in the 2010 Winter Paralympics where German wheelchair curling team finished on eighth place.

== Teams ==
Season	Skip	Third	Second	Lead	Alternate	Coach	Events
2004–05	Jens Jäger	Jens Gäbel	Christian Conrad	Inge Wenzler	Jürgen Sommer	Bernd Weisser, Katja Weisser	WWhCC 2005 (13th)
2006–07	Jens Jäger	Jürgen Sommer	Jens Gäbel	Inge Wenzler	Christian Conrad	Bernd Weisser	WWhCQ 2006 (8th)
2007–08	Marcus Sieger (fourth)	Jens Jäger (skip)	Jürgen Sommer	Alexandra Blickle	Astrid Hoer		WWhCQ 2007 (4th)
2008–09	Jens Jäger	Marcus Sieger	Jens Gäbel	Caren Totzauer	Astrid Hoer	Helmar Erlewein (WWhCC)	WWhCQ 2008 (gold); WWhCC 2009 (bronze)
2009–10	Jens Jäger	Marcus Sieger	Jens Gäbel	Christiane Steger	Astrid Hoer	Helmar Erlewein	WPG 2010 (8th)
2011–12	Jens Jäger	Caren Totzauer	Martin Schlitt	Uwe Raschke	Heike Melchior	Bernd Weisser	WWhCQ 2011 (4th)
2012–13	Jens Jäger	Caren Totzauer	Martin Schlitt	Uwe Raschke	Christiane Steger	Bernd Weisser	WWhCQ 2012 (6th)
2014–15	Jens Jäger	Christiane Putzich	Martin Schlitt	Heike Melchior	Robert Hering	Bernd Weisser	WWhCQ 2014 (silver); WWhCC 2015 (7th)
2015–16	Jens Jäger	Christiane Putzich	Martin Schlitt	Heike Melchior	Harry Pavel	Bernd Weisser	WWhCC 2016 (8th)
