= Jens Gäbel =

German wheelchair curler and Paralympian (born 1968)

- Curler ♂
- Born: 13 August 1968 (age 58)

Team
- Curling club: CC Schwenningen, Villingen-Schwenningen

Curling career
- Member Association: Germany
- World Wheelchair Championship: 3 (2005, 2009, 2011)
- Paralympic: 1 (2010)
Medal record
Wheelchair curling
World Championship
Bronze medal – third place	2009 Vancouver

Jens Gäbel (born 13 August 1968) is a German wheelchair curler.

He participated in the 2010 Winter Paralympics where German wheelchair curling team finished on eighth place.

== Teams ==
Season	Skip	Third	Second	Lead	Alternate	Coach	Events
2004–05	Jens Jäger	Jens Gäbel	Christian Conrad	Inge Wenzler	Jürgen Sommer	Bernd Weisser, Katja Weisser	WWhCC 2005 (13th)
2006–07	Jens Jäger	Jürgen Sommer	Jens Gäbel	Inge Wenzler	Christian Conrad	Bernd Weisser	WWhCQ 2006 (8th)
2008–09	Jens Jäger	Marcus Sieger	Jens Gäbel	Caren Totzauer	Astrid Hoer	Helmar Erlewein (WWhCC)	WWhCQ 2008 (gold); WWhCC 2009 (bronze)
2009–10	Jens Jäger	Marcus Sieger	Jens Gäbel	Christiane Steger	Astrid Hoer	Helmar Erlewein	WPG 2010 (8th)
2010–11	Jens Gäbel (fourth)	Marcus Sieger (skip)	Stefan Deuschl	Christiane Steger	Heike Melchior	Helmar Erlewein	WWhCC 2011 (9th)
