= Lars Enemark =

Danish wheelchair curler

- Curler ♂

Team
- Curling club: Tårnby CC, Tårnby

Curling career
- Member Association: Denmark
- World Wheelchair Championship: 1 (2002)
Medal record
Wheelchair curling

Lars Enemark is a Danish wheelchair curler.

== Teams ==
Season	Skip	Third	Second	Lead	Alternate	Coach	Events
2001–02	Preben Nielsen	Lars Enemark	Kasper Poulsen	Rosita Jensen	Henrik Petersen	Finn Mikkelsen	WWhCC 2002 (9th)
2008–09	Kenneth Ørbæk	Jørn Kristensen	Rosita Jensen	Lars Enemark	Robert Fezerskov Hansen	Per Christensen	WWhCQ 2008 (5th)
