= Astrid Hoer =

German wheelchair curler and Paralympian

- Curler ♀
- Born: 6 January 1950 (age 76)

Team
- Curling club: CC Schwenningen, Villingen-Schwenningen

Curling career
- Member Association: Germany
- World Wheelchair Championship: 1 (2009)
- Paralympic: 1 (2010)
Medal record
Wheelchair curling
World Championship
Bronze medal – third place	2009 Vancouver

Astrid Hoer (born 6 January 1950) is a German wheelchair curler.

She participated in the 2010 Winter Paralympics where German wheelchair curling team finished on eighth place.

== Teams ==
Season	Skip	Third	Second	Lead	Alternate	Coach	Events
2007–08	Marcus Sieger (fourth)	Jens Jäger (skip)	Jürgen Sommer	Alexandra Blickle	Astrid Hoer		WWhCQ 2007 (4th)
2008–09	Jens Jäger	Marcus Sieger	Jens Gäbel	Caren Totzauer	Astrid Hoer	Helmar Erlewein (WWhCC)	WWhCQ 2008 (gold); WWhCC 2009 (bronze)
2009–10	Jens Jäger	Marcus Sieger	Jens Gäbel	Christiane Steger	Astrid Hoer	Helmar Erlewein	WPG 2010 (8th)
