= Pernille Pirchert =

Danish wheelchair curler

- Curler ♀
- Born: 16 November 1955 (age 70)

Team
- Curling club: Tårnby CC, Tårnby

Curling career
- Member Association: Denmark
- World Wheelchair Championship: 1 (2004)
Medal record
Wheelchair curling

Pernille Pirchert (born 16 November 1955) is a Danish wheelchair curler.

== Teams ==
Season	Skip	Third	Second	Lead	Alternate	Coach	Events
2003–04	Kenneth Ørbæk	Jørn Kristensen	Rosita Jensen	Bjarne Jensen	Pernille Pirchert	Per Christensen	WWhCC 2004 (8th)
