= 2008 World Wheelchair Curling Championship – Qualification Event =

2008 World Wheelchair Curling Championship Qualification Event
- Host city: Inverness, Scotland
- Dates: November 5–9, 2007
- Winners: Sweden; Italy
- Skip: Jalle Jungnell
- Third: Glenn Ikonen
- Second: Bernt Sjöberg
- Lead: Anna Hammarlind
- Alternate: Kristina Ulander
- Skip: Andrea Tabanelli
- Third: Egidio Marchese
- Second: Danilo Destro
- Lead: Lucrezia Celentano
- Alternate: Gabrielle Dallapiccola

The qualification event for the 2008 World Wheelchair Curling Championship was held from November 5 to 9, 2007 in Inverness, Scotland. The event's two top finishers, Germany and China, both qualified to participate in the 2008 World Wheelchair Curling Championship. The two qualification spots were given to the top two teams at the conclusion of the round robin.

== Teams ==
China	Czech Republic	Denmark
Skip: Liu Chunyu Third: Zhang Qiang; Second: Liu Wei; Lead: Xu Guangqin; Alternate: Liu Yang	Skip: Radek Musílek Third: Radek Pokorný; Second: Martin Tluk; Lead: Olga Vikturnová; Alternate: Petr Gottlieb	Skip: Kenneth Ørbæk Third: Jørn Kristensen; Second: Sussie Pedersen; Lead: Rosita Jensen; Alternate: Bjarne Jensen
England	Finland	Germany
Skip: Ian Wakenshaw Third: Garry Robson; Second: Robin Crawford; Lead: Valerie Robertson	Skip: Tuomo Aarnikka Third: Jari Manni; Second: Harri Haapala; Lead: Riitta Särösalo; Alternate: Seppo Pihnala	Fourth: Marcus Sieger Skip: Jens Jäger; Second: Jürgen Sommer; Lead: Alexandra Blickle; Alternate: Astrid Hoer
Italy	Poland	Sweden
Skip: Andrea Tabanelli Third: Egidio Marchese; Second: Danilo Destro; Lead: Lucrezia Celentano; Alternate: Gabrielle Dallapiccola	Skip: Eugeniusz Blaszczak Third: Ireneusz Jonski; Second: Maciej Karas; Lead: Magdalena Karlewska	Skip: Jalle Jungnell Third: Glenn Ikonen; Second: Bernt Sjöberg; Lead: Anna Hammarlind; Alternate: Kristina Ulander

== Round-robin standings ==
Key
Teams to World Championships

Country	Skip	W	L
Italy	Andrea Tabanelli	6	2
Sweden	Jalle Jungnell	6	2
Denmark	Kenneth Ørbæk	6	2
Germany	Jens Jäger	6	2
England	Ian Wakenshaw	4	4
Czech Republic	Radek Musílek	3	5
Poland	Eugeniusz Blaszczak	3	5
Finland	Tuomo Aarnikka	1	7
China	Liu Chunyu	1	7

== Round-robin results ==
=== Draw 1 ===
Team	1	2	3	4	5	6	Final
Czech Republic (Musílek)	0	0	0	0	0	3	3
Denmark (Ørbæk) 🔨	1	1	1	1	2	0	6

Team	1	2	3	4	5	6	Final
England (Wakenshaw) 🔨	0	2	2	2	0	0	6
Finland (Aarnikka)	1	0	0	0	2	2	5

Team	1	2	3	4	5	6	Final
Germany (Jäger)	2	0	0	0	0	0	2
Italy (Tabanelli) 🔨	0	2	1	1	3	1	8

Team	1	2	3	4	5	6	Final
Poland (Blaszczak)	1	1	0	1	0	0	3
Sweden (Jungnell) 🔨	0	0	2	0	4	1	7

=== Draw 2 ===
Team	1	2	3	4	5	6	Final
Poland (Blaszczak)	1	0	1	0	1	0	3
Czech Republic (Musílek) 🔨	0	1	0	2	0	4	7

Team	1	2	3	4	5	6	Final
Finland (Aarnikka)	0	0	0	0	0	X	0
Sweden (Jungnell) 🔨	1	3	2	2	3	X	11

Team	1	2	3	4	5	6	Final
England (Wakenshaw) 🔨	2	1	1	0	1	2	7
China (Liu)	0	0	0	1	0	0	1

Team	1	2	3	4	5	6	Final
Denmark (Ørbæk) 🔨	0	4	0	3	0	2	9
Italy (Tabanelli)	1	0	1	0	1	0	3

=== Draw 3 ===
Team	1	2	3	4	5	6	Final
Italy (Tabanelli)	0	0	1	1	1	0	3
Sweden (Jungnell) 🔨	2	3	0	0	0	1	6

Team	1	2	3	4	5	6	Final
China (Liu) 🔨	0	1	1	0	0	1	3
Germany (Jäger)	3	0	0	1	2	0	6

Team	1	2	3	4	5	6	Final
Denmark (Ørbæk) 🔨	4	1	2	0	0	2	9
Poland (Blaszczak)	0	0	0	1	1	0	2

Team	1	2	3	4	5	6	Final
England (Wakenshaw)	0	1	2	4	0	1	8
Czech Republic (Musílek) 🔨	4	0	0	0	1	0	5

=== Draw 4 ===
Team	1	2	3	4	5	6	EE	Final
China (Liu)	1	0	0	0	1	3	0	5
Denmark (Ørbæk) 🔨	0	2	1	2	0	0	1	6

Team	1	2	3	4	5	6	Final
Czech Republic (Musílek) 🔨	3	0	0	4	1	1	9
Sweden (Jungnell)	0	1	1	0	0	0	2

Team	1	2	3	4	5	6	Final
Italy (Tabanelli)	0	3	0	2	1	1	7
Poland (Blaszczak) 🔨	1	0	0	0	0	0	1

Team	1	2	3	4	5	6	Final
Germany (Jäger)	1	0	2	2	3	0	8
Finland (Aarnikka) 🔨	0	1	0	0	0	1	2

=== Draw 5 ===
Team	1	2	3	4	5	6	Final
England (Wakenshaw) 🔨	0	1	2	0	2	0	5
Poland (Blaszczak)	1	0	0	3	0	2	6

Team	1	2	3	4	5	6	Final
Denmark (Ørbæk)	0	2	0	6	2	0	10
Finland (Aarnikka) 🔨	1	0	3	0	0	1	5

Team	1	2	3	4	5	6	Final
China (Liu) 🔨	1	0	0	2	0	0	3
Italy (Tabanelli)	0	5	1	0	3	2	11

Team	1	2	3	4	5	6	Final
Czech Republic (Musílek) 🔨	0	0	0	1	0	0	1
Germany (Jäger)	1	1	2	0	3	1	8

=== Draw 6 ===
Team	1	2	3	4	5	6	Final
Sweden (Jungnell)	0	0	2	0	0	0	2
Germany (Jäger) 🔨	1	2	0	3	1	1	8

Team	1	2	3	4	5	6	Final
Finland (Aarnikka) 🔨	0	1	1	0	1	0	3
Czech Republic (Musílek)	4	0	0	2	0	2	8

Team	1	2	3	4	5	6	Final
Denmark (Ørbæk)	1	0	0	0	2	1	4
England (Wakenshaw) 🔨	0	2	1	4	0	0	7

Team	1	2	3	4	5	6	Final
China (Liu)	0	0	0	2	1	0	3
Poland (Blaszczak) 🔨	1	1	1	0	0	1	4

=== Draw 7 ===
Team	1	2	3	4	5	6	Final
Sweden (Jungnell) 🔨	2	0	3	0	2	0	7
China (Liu)	0	2	0	1	0	2	5

Team	1	2	3	4	5	6	Final
Germany (Jäger)	0	0	1	0	0	0	1
Denmark (Ørbæk) 🔨	4	1	0	1	1	1	8

Team	1	2	3	4	5	6	Final
Poland (Blaszczak)	0	2	2	4	1	0	9
Finland (Aarnikka) 🔨	3	0	0	0	0	1	4

Team	1	2	3	4	5	6	Final
Italy (Tabanelli)	3	1	3	0	0	4	11
England (Wakenshaw) 🔨	0	0	0	1	2	0	3

=== Draw 8 ===
Team	1	2	3	4	5	6	Final
Finland (Aarnikka)	0	0	0	3	0	X	3
Italy (Tabanelli) 🔨	2	4	1	0	3	X	10

Team	1	2	3	4	5	6	Final
Germany (Jäger)	4	0	1	3	2	1	11
Poland (Blaszczak) 🔨	0	1	0	0	0	0	1

Team	1	2	3	4	5	6	Final
Sweden (Jungnell) 🔨	4	1	1	0	3	X	9
England (Wakenshaw)	0	0	0	1	0	X	1

Team	1	2	3	4	5	6	Final
China (Liu)	3	2	0	1	1	2	9
Czech Republic (Musílek) 🔨	0	0	1	0	0	0	1

=== Draw 9 ===
Team	1	2	3	4	5	6	Final
Germany (Jäger)	0	4	0	1	2	1	8
England (Wakenshaw) 🔨	1	0	2	0	0	0	3

Team	1	2	3	4	5	6	Final
Italy (Tabanelli) 🔨	3	0	1	2	0	0	6
Czech Republic (Musílek)	0	1	0	0	1	3	5

Team	1	2	3	4	5	6	EE	Final
Sweden (Jungnell)	2	0	0	0	3	1	4	10
Denmark (Ørbæk) 🔨	0	1	4	1	0	0	0	6

Team	1	2	3	4	5	6	Final
Finland (Aarnikka)	1	0	2	1	2	1	7
China (Liu) 🔨	0	4	0	0	0	0	4

== Tiebreakers ==
Team	1	2	3	4	5	6	Final
Germany (Jäger) 🔨	1	0	1	0	0	0	2
Sweden (Jungnell)	0	3	0	5	1	1	10

Team	1	2	3	4	5	6	Final
Italy (Tabanelli)	0	1	0	3	0	2	6
Denmark (Ørbæk) 🔨	1	0	1	0	2	0	4
