= 2016 World Wheelchair Curling Championship – Qualification Event =

2016 World Wheelchair Curling Championship Qualification Event
- Host city: Lohja, Finland
- Arena: Kisakallio Sports Institute
- Dates: November 7–12, 2015
- Winner: Norway
- Skip: Rune Lorentsen
- Third: Jostein Stordahl
- Second: Ole Fredrik Syversen
- Lead: Sissel Løchen
- Alternate: Gina Kristin Brøndbo
- Finalist: South Korea (Yang Hui-tae)

The qualification event of the 2016 World Wheelchair Curling Championship, known as the 2015 World Wheelchair Curling B-Championship, was held from November 7 to 12, 2015 at the Kisakallio Sports Institute in Lohja, Finland. The qualification event was open to any World Curling Federation member nation not already qualified for the World Championship. The event's two top finishers will join the top seven finishers from the last World Wheelchair Curling Championship at this season's event in Lucerne, Switzerland.

This event marked the first appearance of the nations of Estonia, Israel, and Lithuania at an international wheelchair curling event.

== Teams ==
Country	Skip	Third	Second	Lead	Alternate	Coach
Czech Republic	Radek Musílek	Martin Tluk	Stepan Benes	Jana Břinčilová	Žaneta Schmuttermeierová	Jiri Marsa
Denmark	Kenneth Ørbæk	Jørn Kristensen	Helle Christiansen	Christian Richardson	Carsten Hansen	Per Christensen
England	Rosemary Lenton	Stewart Pimblett	Stephen McGarry	Gary Logan	Christine Warwick	Joan Reed
Estonia	Viljar Villiste	Andrei Koitmae	Lauri Murasov	Signe Falkenberg	Ain Villau	Erkki Lill
Israel	Oren Iluz	Oshri Abuksis	Zohar Albert	Liat Kobo		Sharon Cohen
Italy	Paolo Ioriatti	Gabriele Dallapiccola	Lucrezia Celentano	Orietta Berto	Marco Salamone	Gianandrea Gallinatto
Japan	Isamu Hatakeyama	Haruo Matsuhashi	Eui Nozawa	Keiko Hatayama	Kana Matsuda	Junichi Ishida
Latvia	Aleksandrs Dimbovkis	Aleksandrs Vitohins	Jurijs Volgins	Killiane Julija	Olegs Lihuta	Ieva Krusta
Lithuania	Joniskis Linas	Balsys Vytautas	Grybe Gintautas	Sidlauskaite Ramune	Pacevicius Aleksandras	
Norway	Rune Lorentsen	Jostein Stordahl	Ole Fredrik Syversen	Sissel Løchen	Gina Kristin Brøndbo	Peter Dahlman
Poland	Eugeniusz Błaszczak	Ireneusz Jonski	Antoni Pardo	Agata Szymborska	Dorota Wozniak	Agnieszka Marzecka
Scotland	Aileen Neilson (fourth)	Hugh Nibloe (skip)	Gregor Ewan	Angela Malone	Robert McPherson	Sheila Swan
Slovenia	Robert Zerovnik	Ziga Bajde	Joze Klemen	Ziva Hribar	Jovita Jeglic	Gregor Verbinc
South Korea	Yang Hui-tae	Cha Jae-goan	Seo Soon-seok	Bang Min-ja	Jung Seung-won	Beak Jong-chul
Sweden	Patrik Kallin	Kicki Ulander	Ronny Persson	Zandra Reppe	Gert Erlandsson	Mia Boman

== Round-robin standings ==
Final round-robin standings

Key
Teams to Playoffs

Group A	Skip	W	L
South Korea	Yang Hui-tae	5	1
Scotland	Hugh Nibloe	5	1
Japan	Isamu Hatakeyama	4	2
Denmark	Kenneth Ørbæk	3	3
Latvia	Aleksandrs Dimbovkis	2	4
England	Rosemary Lenton	2	4
Estonia	Viljar Villiste	0	6

Group B	Skip	W	L
Norway	Rune Lorentsen	7	0
Czech Republic	Radek Musílek	6	1
Sweden	Patrik Kallin	5	2
Italy	Paolo Ioriatti	4	3
Slovenia	Robert Zerovnik	3	4
Lithuania	Joniskis Linas	2	5
Poland	Eugeniusz Błaszczak	1	6
Israel	Oren Iluz	0	7

== Round-robin results ==
All draw times are listed in Eastern European Time (UTC+02).

=== Draw 1 ===
Saturday, November 7, 16:30

Sheet A	1	2	3	4	5	6	7	8	Final
Scotland (Nibloe) 🔨	3	1	1	1	0	0	0	0	6
Estonia (Villiste)	0	0	0	0	1	0	0	0	1

Sheet B	1	2	3	4	5	6	7	8	Final
South Korea (Yang)	3	1	0	2	0	0	3	X	9
England (Lenton) 🔨	0	0	1	0	1	2	0	X	4

Sheet C	1	2	3	4	5	6	7	8	Final
Japan (Hatakeyama) 🔨	1	1	0	3	1	2	0	X	8
Denmark (Ørbæk)	0	0	1	0	0	0	2	X	3

=== Draw 2 ===
Saturday, November 7, 20:00

Sheet A	1	2	3	4	5	6	7	8	Final
Sweden (Kallin) 🔨	2	0	0	2	0	2	0	1	7
Slovenia (Zerovnik)	0	1	1	0	2	0	1	0	5

Sheet B	1	2	3	4	5	6	7	8	Final
Norway (Lorentsen) 🔨	4	0	2	3	0	2	1	X	12
Italy (Ioriatti)	0	4	0	0	3	0	0	X	7

Sheet C	1	2	3	4	5	6	7	8	Final
Czech Republic (Musílek) 🔨	4	3	3	1	3	0	X	X	14
Lithuania (Linas)	0	0	0	0	0	1	X	X	1

Sheet D	1	2	3	4	5	6	7	8	Final
Poland (Błaszczak) 🔨	0	2	2	3	2	2	0	X	11
Israel (Iluz)	1	0	0	0	0	0	1	X	2

=== Draw 3 ===
Sunday, November 8, 8:30

Sheet B	1	2	3	4	5	6	7	8	Final
Japan (Hatakeyama)	1	2	0	1	0	0	0	4	8
Latvia (Dimbovkis) 🔨	0	0	2	0	1	1	1	0	5

Sheet C	1	2	3	4	5	6	7	8	Final
Estonia (Villiste) 🔨	0	0	0	0	0	2	0	X	2
England (Lenton)	2	2	1	1	2	0	2	X	10

Sheet D	1	2	3	4	5	6	7	8	Final
Scotland (Nibloe) 🔨	1	0	1	0	0	2	0	X	4
South Korea (Yang)	0	1	0	3	2	0	1	X	7

=== Draw 4 ===
Sunday, November 8, 12:00

Sheet A	1	2	3	4	5	6	7	8	Final
Lithuania (Linas) 🔨	1	0	0	2	3	0	3	0	9
Israel (Iluz)	0	1	1	0	0	1	0	1	4

Sheet B	1	2	3	4	5	6	7	8	Final
Czech Republic (Musílek) 🔨	1	0	3	0	3	0	1	1	9
Poland (Błaszczak)	0	3	0	1	0	1	0	0	5

Sheet C	1	2	3	4	5	6	7	8	Final
Slovenia (Zerovnik)	0	0	0	0	1	0	2	X	3
Italy (Ioriatti) 🔨	1	2	3	2	0	3	0	X	11

Sheet D	1	2	3	4	5	6	7	8	Final
Sweden (Kallin) 🔨	0	1	0	1	2	0	0	0	4
Norway (Lorentsen)	0	0	3	0	0	1	0	1	5

=== Draw 5 ===
Sunday, November 8, 15:30

Sheet A	1	2	3	4	5	6	7	8	Final
Japan (Hatakeyama) 🔨	3	0	0	0	0	0	0	X	3
England (Lenton)	0	1	1	1	1	1	3	X	8

Sheet C	1	2	3	4	5	6	7	8	EE	Final
Latvia (Dimbovkis)	0	1	1	0	2	0	0	1	0	5
South Korea (Yang) 🔨	1	0	0	1	0	1	2	0	2	7

Sheet D	1	2	3	4	5	6	7	8	Final
Estonia (Villiste) 🔨	0	0	2	0	2	0	0	3	7
Denmark (Ørbæk)	1	2	0	2	0	2	1	0	8

=== Draw 6 ===
Sunday, November 8, 19:00

Sheet A	1	2	3	4	5	6	7	8	Final
Czech Republic (Musílek)	0	1	2	2	3	0	1	X	9
Italy (Ioriatti) 🔨	0	0	0	0	0	2	0	X	2

Sheet B	1	2	3	4	5	6	7	8	Final
Sweden (Kallin)	3	3	2	0	3	1	4	X	16
Israel (Iluz) 🔨	0	0	0	1	0	0	0	X	1

Sheet C	1	2	3	4	5	6	7	8	Final
Poland (Błaszczak) 🔨	0	0	0	0	0	0	X	X	0
Norway (Lorentsen)	4	2	1	1	4	3	X	X	15

Sheet D	1	2	3	4	5	6	7	8	Final
Slovenia (Zerovnik)	1	3	0	0	4	5	X	X	13
Lithuania (Linas) 🔨	0	0	1	2	0	0	X	X	3

=== Draw 7 ===
Monday, November 9, 9:00

Sheet A	1	2	3	4	5	6	7	8	Final
South Korea (Yang)	0	0	3	0	0	2	0	1	6
Denmark (Ørbæk) 🔨	1	1	0	1	1	0	1	0	5

Sheet B	1	2	3	4	5	6	7	8	Final
Latvia (Dimbovkis) 🔨	2	1	0	4	6	2	X	X	15
Estonia (Villiste)	0	0	1	0	0	0	X	X	1

Sheet C	1	2	3	4	5	6	7	8	Final
Scotland (Nibloe)	2	1	0	0	4	2	X	X	9
Japan (Hatakeyama) 🔨	0	0	1	1	0	0	X	X	2

=== Draw 8 ===
Monday, November 9, 13:00

Sheet A	1	2	3	4	5	6	7	8	Final
Norway (Lorentsen) 🔨	3	3	3	3	2	2	X	X	16
Lithuania (Linas)	0	0	0	0	0	0	X	X	0

Sheet B	1	2	3	4	5	6	7	8	Final
Poland (Błaszczak) 🔨	0	0	1	0	4	1	0	0	6
Slovenia (Zerovnik)	2	3	0	4	0	0	1	2	12

Sheet C	1	2	3	4	5	6	7	8	Final
Sweden (Kallin) 🔨	1	0	0	0	1	0	4	0	6
Czech Republic (Musílek)	0	2	2	1	0	3	0	2	10

Sheet D	1	2	3	4	5	6	7	8	Final
Israel (Iluz)	0	0	2	0	0	0	X	X	2
Italy (Ioriatti) 🔨	5	2	0	2	4	2	X	X	15

=== Draw 9 ===
Monday, November 9, 17:00

Sheet A	1	2	3	4	5	6	7	8	Final
Latvia (Dimbovkis)	0	0	0	1	0	1	0	X	2
Scotland (Nibloe) 🔨	0	2	1	0	2	0	3	X	8

Sheet B	1	2	3	4	5	6	7	8	Final
England (Lenton)	0	0	1	2	0	0	0	X	3
Denmark (Ørbæk) 🔨	1	1	0	0	1	1	4	X	8

Sheet D	1	2	3	4	5	6	7	8	Final
Japan (Hatakeyama)	2	1	2	1	0	1	0	X	7
Estonia (Villiste) 🔨	0	0	0	0	1	0	1	X	2

=== Draw 10 ===
Tuesday, November 10, 8:30

Sheet A	1	2	3	4	5	6	7	8	Final
Poland (Błaszczak)	2	0	1	0	0	0	0	X	3
Sweden (Kallin) 🔨	0	1	0	2	2	2	1	X	8

Sheet B	1	2	3	4	5	6	7	8	Final
Italy (Ioriatti) 🔨	3	1	3	0	3	0	X	X	10
Lithuania (Linas)	0	0	0	1	0	2	X	X	3

Sheet C	1	2	3	4	5	6	7	8	Final
Norway (Lorentsen) 🔨	3	4	1	1	6	4	X	X	18
Israel (Iluz)	0	0	0	0	0	0	X	X	0

Sheet D	1	2	3	4	5	6	7	8	Final
Czech Republic (Musílek) 🔨	0	3	0	4	0	1	1	X	9
Slovenia (Zerovnik)	0	0	2	0	0	0	0	X	2

=== Draw 11 ===
Tuesday, November 10, 12:00

Sheet A	1	2	3	4	5	6	7	8	Final
Estonia (Villiste) 🔨	0	2	0	0	0	1	0	X	3
South Korea (Yang)	2	0	1	1	4	0	1	X	9

Sheet C	1	2	3	4	5	6	7	8	Final
England (Lenton) 🔨	0	1	0	1	0	2	X	X	4
Scotland (Nibloe)	2	0	5	0	3	0	X	X	10

Sheet D	1	2	3	4	5	6	7	8	Final
Denmark (Ørbæk) 🔨	0	1	0	1	1	1	0	2	6
Latvia (Dimbovkis)	2	0	1	0	0	0	2	0	5

=== Draw 12 ===
Tuesday, November 10, 15:30

Sheet A	1	2	3	4	5	6	7	8	Final
Slovenia (Zerovnik)	0	0	0	0	0	0	X	X	0
Norway (Lorentsen) 🔨	4	1	3	2	1	1	X	X	12

Sheet B	Final
Israel (Iluz)	L
Czech Republic (Musílek)	W

Sheet C	1	2	3	4	5	6	7	8	Final
Italy (Ioriatti) 🔨	0	1	0	2	0	0	0	X	3
Sweden (Kallin)	1	0	2	0	1	1	2	X	7

Sheet D	1	2	3	4	5	6	7	8	Final
Lithuania (Linas)	2	1	2	1	0	0	0	2	8
Poland (Błaszczak) 🔨	0	0	0	0	1	1	3	0	5

=== Draw 13 ===
Tuesday, November 10, 19:00

Sheet A	1	2	3	4	5	6	7	8	Final
England (Lenton) 🔨	2	0	1	0	0	0	X	X	3
Latvia (Dimbovkis)	0	3	0	1	3	3	X	X	10

Sheet B	1	2	3	4	5	6	7	8	Final
Denmark (Ørbæk)	0	0	0	1	0	1	1	0	3
Scotland (Nibloe) 🔨	0	1	2	0	2	0	0	1	6

Sheet D	1	2	3	4	5	6	7	8	Final
South Korea (Yang)	0	0	0	1	1	0	1	0	3
Japan (Hatakeyama) 🔨	1	1	1	0	0	2	0	1	6

=== Draw 14 ===
Wednesday, November 11, 9:00

Sheet A	1	2	3	4	5	6	7	8	Final
Italy (Ioriatti) 🔨	3	0	1	0	0	2	0	2	8
Poland (Błaszczak)	0	2	0	1	2	0	2	0	7

Sheet B	1	2	3	4	5	6	7	8	Final
Lithuania (Linas)	0	0	0	0	0	0	X	X	0
Sweden (Kallin) 🔨	2	2	3	4	1	3	X	X	15

Sheet C	1	2	3	4	5	6	7	8	Final
Israel (Iluz)	0	1	0	0	0	1	0	X	2
Slovenia (Zerovnik) 🔨	1	0	1	2	4	0	3	X	11

Sheet D	1	2	3	4	5	6	7	8	Final
Norway (Lorentsen) 🔨	2	0	2	0	0	3	5	X	12
Czech Republic (Musílek)	0	3	0	1	1	0	0	X	5

== Playoffs ==
Quarterfinals
A2	Scotland	4
B3	Sweden	9
B2	Czech Republic	11
A3	Japan	3

Semifinals
B1	Norway	10
B3	Sweden	3
A1	South Korea	9
B2	Czech Republic	3

Final
B1	Norway	7
A1	South Korea	5

Bronze Medal Game
B3	Sweden	5
B2	Czech Republic	4

=== Quarterfinals ===
Wednesday, November 11, 18:00

Sheet 1	1	2	3	4	5	6	7	8	Final
Scotland (Nibloe) 🔨	0	1	0	0	1	0	2	X	4
Sweden (Kallin)	1	0	3	1	0	4	0	X	9

Sheet 2	1	2	3	4	5	6	7	8	Final
Czech Republic (Musílek)	1	1	2	2	0	0	5	X	11
Japan (Hatakeyama) 🔨	0	0	0	0	2	1	0	X	3

=== Semifinals ===
Thursday, November 12, 9:00

Sheet 1	1	2	3	4	5	6	7	8	Final
Norway (Lorentsen) 🔨	1	2	2	0	4	1	0	X	10
Sweden (Kallin)	0	0	0	1	0	0	2	X	3

Sheet 4	1	2	3	4	5	6	7	8	Final
South Korea (Yang) 🔨	5	0	0	2	1	1	0	X	9
Czech Republic (Musílek)	0	0	1	0	0	0	2	X	3

=== Bronze medal game ===
Thursday, November 12, 14:30

Sheet 2	1	2	3	4	5	6	7	8	Final
Sweden (Kallin)	1	1	1	1	0	0	0	1	5
Czech Republic (Musílek) 🔨	0	0	0	0	2	1	1	0	4

=== Gold medal game ===
Thursday, November 12, 14:30

Sheet 3	1	2	3	4	5	6	7	8	EE	Final
Norway (Lorentsen) 🔨	0	1	0	1	0	2	0	1	2	7
South Korea (Yang)	0	0	1	0	2	0	2	0	0	5
