= Patrik Kallin =

Swedish wheelchair curler (born 1979)

- Curler ♂
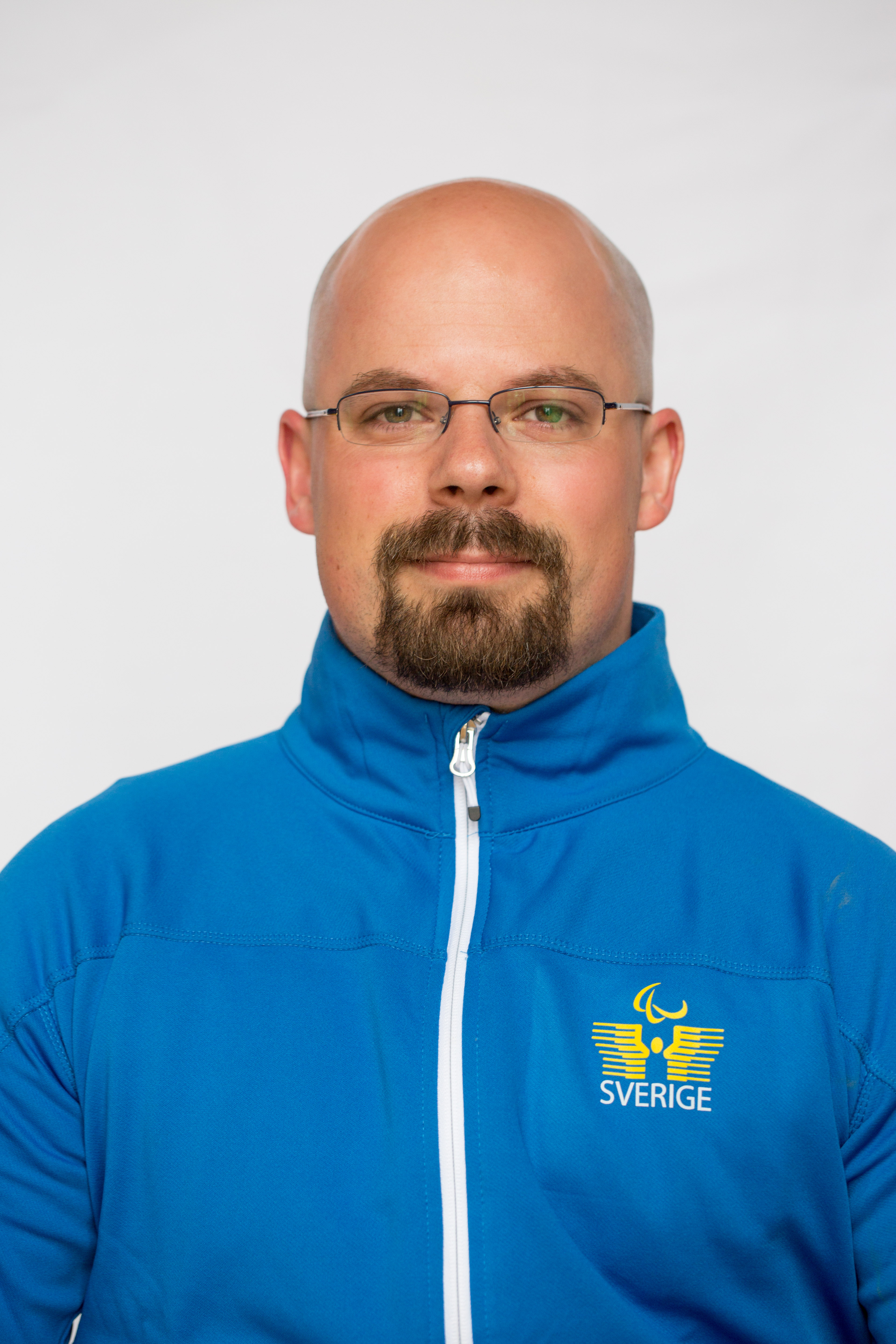
- Born: January 4, 1979 (age 47); Härnösand

Team
- Curling club: Södertälje CK

Curling career
- Member Association: Sweden
- World Wheelchair Championship: 4 (2011, 2012, 2013, 2015)
- Paralympic: 2 (2010, 2014)
Medal record
Wheelchair curling
Winter Paralympics
Bronze medal – third place	2010 Vancouver
World Wheelchair Championship
Silver medal – second place	2013 Sochi
Swedish Wheelchair Championship
Gold medal – first place	2015
Gold medal – first place	2016
Gold medal – first place	2017
Bronze medal – third place	2014

Patrik Åke Kalli (born January 4, 1979 in Härnösand) is a Swedish wheelchair curler.

He participated at the 2010 Winter Paralympics where Swedish team won a bronze medal, and at the 2014 Winter Paralympics where Swedish team finished on seventh place.

== Wheelchair curling teams and events ==
Season	Skip	Third	Second	Lead	Alternate	Coach	Events
2009–10	Jalle Jungnell	Glenn Ikonen	Patrik Burman	Anette Wilhelm	Patrik Kallin	Tomas Nordin	WPG 2010 (bronze)
2010–11	Glenn Ikonen	Patrik Burman	Patrik Kallin	Kristina Ulander	Gert Erlandsson	Jalle Jungnell	WWhCC 2011 (8th)
2011–12	Jalle Jungnell	Gert Erlandsson	Patrik Kallin	Anette Wilhelm		Tomas Nordin	WWhCC 2012 (6th)
2012–13	Jalle Jungnell	Glenn Ikonen	Patrik Kallin	Kristina Ulander	Gert Erlandsson	Mats Mabergs	WWhCC 2013 (silver)
2013–14	Jalle Jungnell	Glenn Ikonen	Patrik Kallin	Ronny Persson			SWhCC 2014 (bronze)
2013–14	Jalle Jungnell	Glenn Ikonen	Patrik Kallin	Kristina Ulander	Zandra Reppe	Mats Mabergs	WPG 2014 (7th)
2014–15	Patrik Kallin	Kristina Ulander	Ronny Persson	Anette Wilhelm			SWhCC 2015 (gold)
2014–15	Jalle Jungnell	Patrik Kallin	Ronny Persson	Kristina Ulander	Zandra Reppe	Mats Mabergs	WWhCC 2015 (9th)
2015–16	2015—16	Ronny Persson (4th)	Patrik Kallin (skip)	Kristina Ulander	Gert Erlandsson		SWhCC 2016 (gold)
2015–16	Patrik Kallin	Kristina Ulander	Ronny Persson	Zandra Reppe	Gert Erlandsson	Mia Boman	WWhBCC 2015 (bronze)
2016–17	Patrik Kallin	Kristina Ulander	Ronny Persson	Gert Erlandsson			SWhCC 2017 (gold)
