= Kristina Ulander =

Swedish wheelchair curler (born 1981)

- Curler
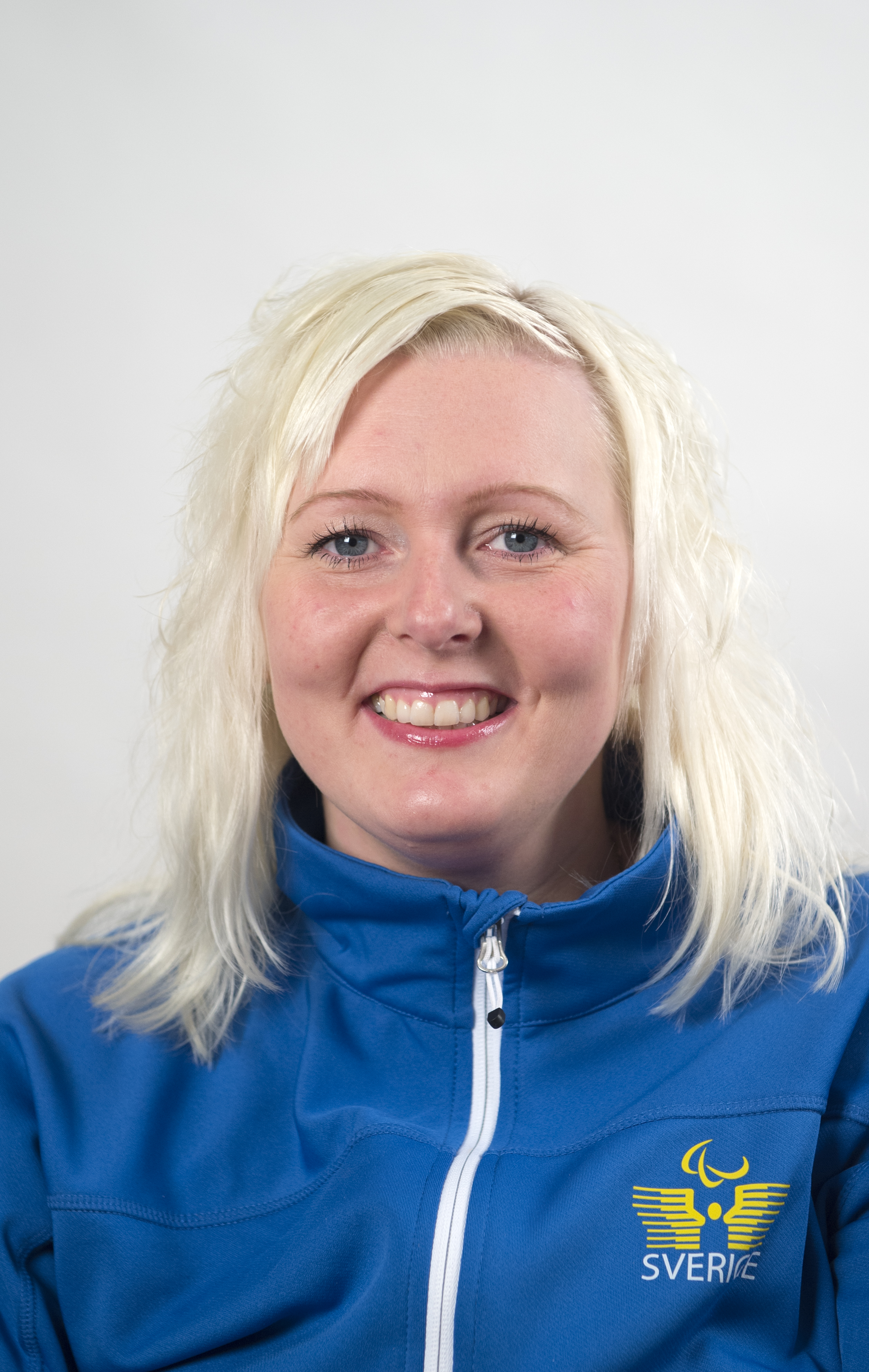
- Born: 16 September 1981 (age 45); Sollefteå, Sweden

Team
- Curling club: Härnösands CK, Härnösand

Curling career
- Member Association: Sweden
- World Wheelchair Championship: 8 (2007, 2008, 2011, 2013, 2015, 2020, 2024, 2025)
- Paralympic: 4 (2014, 2018, 2022, 2026)
Medal record
Wheelchair curling
Representing Sweden
Winter Paralympics
Silver medal – second place	2022 Beijing	Mixed team
Bronze medal – third place	2026 Milano Cortina	Mixed team
World Wheelchair Championship
Silver medal – second place	2013 Sochi
Bronze medal – third place	2020 Wetzikon

Kristina "Kicki" Marlene Ulander (born 16 September 1981) is a Swedish wheelchair curler.

== Career ==
She participated at the 2014 Winter Paralympics and 2018 Winter Paralympics where Swedish team finished on seventh and tenth places respectively.

She started wheelchair curling in 2006 at the age of 25.

== Teams ==
Season	Skip	Third	Second	Lead	Alternate	Coach	Events
2006–07	Roger Westergren	Kenneth Nilsson	Gert Erlandsson	Anna Hammarlind	Kristina Ulander	Mikael Löfvenius	WWhCC 2007 (10th)
2007–08	Jalle Jungnell	Glenn Ikonen	Bernt Sjöberg	Anna Hammarlind	Kristina Ulander		WWhCC-QE 2008
2007–08	Jalle Jungnell	Glenn Ikonen	Bernt Sjöberg	Kristina Ulander	Anna Hammarlind	Olle Brudsten	WWhCC 2008 (6th)
2010–11	Glenn Ikonen	Patrik Burman	Patrik Kallin	Kristina Ulander	Gert Erlandsson	Jalle Jungnell	WWhCC 2011 (8th)
2012–13	Jalle Jungnell	Glenn Ikonen	Patrik Kallin	Kristina Ulander	Gert Erlandsson	Mats Mabergs	WWhCC 2013 (silver)
2013–14	Patrik Burman	Michael Sahlén	Kristina Ulander	Bernt Sjöberg			SWhCC 2014 (gold)
2013–14	Jalle Jungnell	Glenn Ikonen	Patrik Kallin	Kristina Ulander	Zandra Reppe	Mats Mabergs	WPG 2014 (7th)
2014–15	Patrik Kallin	Kristina Ulander	Ronny Persson	Anette Wilhelm			SWhCC 2015 (gold)
2014–15	Jalle Jungnell	Patrik Kallin	Ronny Persson	Kristina Ulander	Zandra Reppe	Mats Mabergs	WWhCC 2015 (9th)
2015–16	Patrik Kallin	Kristina Ulander	Ronny Persson	Zandra Reppe	Gert Erlandsson	Mia Boman	WWhCC-B 2015 (bronze)
2015–16	Ronny Persson (fourth)	Patrik Kallin (skip)	Kristina Ulander	Gert Erlandsson			SWhCC 2016 (gold)
2016–17	Patrik Kallin	Viljo Petersson-Dahl	Ronny Persson	Kristina Ulander	Zandra Reppe	Mia Boman	WWhCC-B 2016 (7th)
2016–17	Patrik Kallin	Kristina Ulander	Ronny Persson	Gert Erlandsson			SWhCC 2017 (gold)
2017–18	Viljo Petersson-Dahl	Ronny Persson	Mats-Ola Engborg	Kristina Ulander	Zandra Reppe	Peter Narup, Mia Boman	WPG 2018 (10th)
2019–20	Kristina Ulander	Ronny Persson	Marcus Holm	Zandra Reppe			SWhCC 2020 (silver)
2019–20	Viljo Petersson-Dahl	Mats-Ola Engborg	Ronny Persson	Kristina Ulander	Zandra Reppe	Alison Kreviazuk	WWhCC-B 2019 (silver); WWhCC 2020 (bronze)
2023–24	Vilko Petersson-Dahl	Ronny Persson	Marcus Holm	Sabina Johansson	Kristina Ulander	Peter Narup	WWhCC 2024 (4th)
2024–25	Vilko Petersson-Dahl	Ronny Persson	Sabina Johansson	Kristina Ulander	Tommy Andersson	Peter Narup	WWhCC 2025 (5th)
