= Kasper Poulsen =

Danish wheelchair curler and coach

- Curler ♂

Team
- Curling club: Tårnby CC, Tårnby

Curling career
- Member Association: Denmark
- World Wheelchair Championship: 1 (2002)
Medal record
Wheelchair curling

Kasper Poulsen is a Danish wheelchair curler and curling coach.

== Teams ==
Season	Skip	Third	Second	Lead	Alternate	Coach	Events
2001–02	Preben Nielsen	Lars Enemark	Kasper Poulsen	Rosita Jensen	Henrik Petersen	Finn Mikkelsen	WWhCC 2002 (9th)

== Record as a coach of national teams ==
Year	Tournament, event	National team	Place
2014	2014 World Wheelchair Curling Qualification Competition	Denmark (wheelchair)	9
