= 2009 World Wheelchair Curling Championship – Qualification Event =

2009 World Wheelchair Curling Championship Qualifying Event
- Host city: Prague, Czech Republic
- Dates: November 15–20, 2008
- Winner: Germany
- Skip: Jens Jäger
- Third: Marcus Sieger
- Second: Jens Gäbel
- Lead: Astrid Hoer
- Alternate: Caren Totzauer
- Finalist: China (Wang Haitao)

The qualification event for the 2009 World Wheelchair Curling Championship took place from November 15 to 20, 2008 in Prague, Czech Republic. The event's two top finishers, Germany and China, both qualified to participate in the 2009 World Wheelchair Curling Championship.

The two qualification spots are determined as follows: After the conclusion of the round robin, the top four teams advance to the playoffs. The playoffs follow the first and second rounds of the page playoff system. In the first round, he first seed playing the second and the third seed playing the fourth. In the final round, the loser of 1 v. 2 plays the winner of 3 vs. 4 in the Second Place Game, like in the semifinal of the page playoff system. However, unlike the page playoff system, the winner of 1 vs. 2 and the loser of 3 vs. 4 do not play. The winner of 1 vs. 2 qualifies to the worlds, while the winner of the second place game also qualifies to the worlds.

== Teams ==
China	Czech Republic	Denmark	Finland	Germany
Skip: Wang Haitao Third: Liu Wei; Second: Xu Guangqin; Lead: He Jun; Alternate: Liu Chunyu; Coach: Li Hongchen	Skip: Radek Musílek Third: Radek Pokorný; Second: Martin Tluk; Lead: Michaela Charvátová; Alternate: Petr Gottlieb; Coach: Vit Nekovarik	Skip: Kenneth Ørbæk Third: Jørn Kristensen; Second: Rosita Jensen; Lead: Lars Enemark; Alternate: Robert Fezerskov Hansen; Coach: Per Christensen	Skip: Vesa Hellman Third: Tuomo Aarnikka; Second: Jari Manni; Lead: Riitta Särösalo; Alternate: Seppo Pihnala; Coach: Lauri Ikävalko	Skip: Jens Jäger Third: Marcus Sieger; Second: Jens Gäbel; Lead: Caren Totzauer; Alternate: Astrid Hoer
Japan	Poland	Russia	Slovakia	Wales
Skip: Yoji Nakajima Third: Katsuo Ichikawa; Second: Takashi Hidai; Lead: Ayako Saitoh; Coaches: Emi Kaneko, Satako Ogawa	Skip: Boguslaw Sondej Third: Andrzej Ferfecki; Second: Stefan Chmielorz; Lead: Barbara Mazurkiewicz; Alternate: Czeslaw Lawrynowicz; Coaches: Kazimierz Chec, Arkadiusz Detyniecki	Skip: Marat Romanov Third: Andrey Smirnov; Second: Nikolay Melnikov; Lead: Oxana Slesarenko; Alternate: Mikhail Mokretsov; Coach: Alexandra Ryzkova	Skip: Radoslav Duris Third: Dusan Pitonak; Second: Branislav Jakubec; Lead: Alena Kánová; Alternate: Imrich Lyocsa; Coach: Pavol Pitonak	Skip: Mike Preston Third: William Bell; Second: Allan Young; Lead: Marion Harrison; Alternate: Valerie Prydderch; Coach: John Stone

== Round robin standings ==
Country	Skip	W	L
Germany	Jens Jäger	8	1
Russia	Marat Romanov	7	2
Czech Republic	Radek Musílek	7	2
China	Wang Haitao	7	2
Denmark	Kenneth Ørbæk	5	4
Japan	Yoji Nakajima	4	5
Finland	Vesa Hellman	3	6
Poland	Boguslaw Sondej	2	7
Wales	Mike Preston	2	7
Slovakia	Radoslav Duris	0	9

== Results ==
=== Draw 1 ===
Saturday, November 15, 9:00

Sheet A	1	2	3	4	5	6	7	8	Final
Czech Republic (Musílek) 🔨	1	1	1	3	5	3	0	0	14
Wales (Preston)	0	0	0	0	0	0	1	1	2

Sheet B	1	2	3	4	5	6	7	8	Final
Finland (Hellman) 🔨	0	0	0	1	1	0	0	0	2
China (Wang)	1	4	4	0	0	1	2	1	12

Sheet C	1	2	3	4	5	6	7	8	EE	Final
Germany (Jäger) 🔨	0	3	0	0	3	2	0	0	3	11
Russia (Romanov)	2	0	2	1	0	0	1	2	0	8

Sheet D	1	2	3	4	5	6	7	8	Final
Denmark (Ørbæk) 🔨	5	0	2	0	2	0	0	1	10
Japan (Nakajima)	0	1	0	1	0	3	3	0	8

=== Draw 2 ===
Saturday, November 15, 13:30

Sheet A	1	2	3	4	5	6	7	8	Final
Slovakia (Duris) 🔨	3	0	0	0	2	0	0	0	5
Poland (Sondej)	0	2	1	1	0	1	2	1	8

Sheet B	1	2	3	4	5	6	7	8	Final
Japan (Nakajima) 🔨	0	2	1	0	0	1	0	0	4
Germany (Jäger)	1	0	0	1	2	0	1	1	6

Sheet C	1	2	3	4	5	6	7	8	Final
China (Wang) 🔨	3	1	2	1	1	0	1	X	9
Denmark (Ørbæk)	0	0	0	0	0	1	0	X	1

Sheet D	1	2	3	4	5	6	7	8	Final
Wales (Preston) 🔨	2	2	0	0	0	0	0	1	5
Finland (Hellman)	0	0	2	3	1	2	3	0	11

=== Draw 3 ===
Sunday, November 16, 9:00

Sheet A	1	2	3	4	5	6	7	8	EE	Final
Russia (Romanov) 🔨	0	2	0	2	0	1	0	1	1	7
Denmark (Ørbæk)	1	0	3	0	1	0	1	0	0	6

Sheet B	1	2	3	4	5	6	7	8	Final
Slovakia (Duris) 🔨	2	0	0	0	1	0	0	1	4
Czech Republic (Musílek)	0	2	1	2	0	1	1	0	7

Sheet C	1	2	3	4	5	6	7	8	Final
Japan (Nakajima) 🔨	0	0	2	0	0	2	2	0	6
Wales (Preston)	1	2	0	4	1	0	0	1	9

Sheet D	1	2	3	4	5	6	7	8	Final
Poland (Sondej) 🔨	0	0	1	0	0	2	0	0	3
China (Wang)	1	3	0	4	2	0	2	1	13

=== Draw 4 ===
Sunday, November 16, 13:30

Sheet A	1	2	3	4	5	6	7	8	Final
Japan (Nakajima)	2	0	1	0	0	0	1	X	4
China (Wang) 🔨	0	2	0	3	2	1	0	X	8

Sheet B	1	2	3	4	5	6	7	8	Final
Poland (Sondej)	0	0	2	1	0	0	0	0	3
Germany (Jäger) 🔨	1	1	0	0	2	1	2	1	8

Sheet C	1	2	3	4	5	6	7	8	Final
Denmark (Ørbæk)	3	0	0	1	3	1	0	X	8
Finland (Hellman) 🔨	0	3	1	0	0	0	1	X	5

Sheet D	1	2	3	4	5	6	7	8	Final
Russia (Romanov)	0	0	3	2	0	1	1	1	8
Slovakia (Duris) 🔨	1	1	0	0	1	0	0	0	3

=== Draw 5 ===
Sunday, November 16, 18:00

Sheet A	1	2	3	4	5	6	7	8	Final
Wales (Preston) 🔨	2	0	0	0	3	0	0	0	5
Germany (Jäger)	0	1	1	1	0	2	1	3	9

Sheet B	1	2	3	4	5	6	7	8	Final
Finland (Hellman) 🔨	0	1	0	0	1	1	0	X	3
Czech Republic (Musílek)	2	0	5	1	0	0	2	X	10

=== Draw 6 ===
Monday, November 17, 9:00

Sheet B	1	2	3	4	5	6	7	8	Final
Denmark (Ørbæk) 🔨	1	0	3	0	2	0	1	2	9
Poland (Sondej)	0	1	0	1	0	2	0	0	4

Sheet C	1	2	3	4	5	6	7	8	Final
Finland (Hellman) 🔨	1	1	0	0	3	0	1	0	6
Slovakia (Duris)	0	0	1	1	0	1	0	2	5

Sheet D	1	2	3	4	5	6	7	8	Final
Japan (Nakajima) 🔨	0	1	0	0	1	0	X	X	2
Czech Republic (Musílek)	1	0	4	1	0	6	X	X	12

=== Draw 7 ===
Monday, November 17, 13:30

Sheet A	1	2	3	4	5	6	7	8	Final
Japan (Nakajima)	1	0	1	1	0	1	2	0	6
Russia (Romanov) 🔨	0	2	0	0	1	0	0	1	4

Sheet B	1	2	3	4	5	6	7	8	Final
Slovakia (Duris) 🔨	1	0	0	3	0	1	0	X	5
Germany (Jäger)	0	3	2	0	3	0	1	X	9

Sheet C	1	2	3	4	5	6	7	8	Final
China (Wang) 🔨	4	0	2	2	2	2	0	2	14
Wales (Preston)	0	1	0	0	0	0	2	0	3

=== Draw 8 ===
Monday, November 17, 18:00

Sheet A	1	2	3	4	5	6	7	8	Final
Germany (Jäger) 🔨	0	0	1	4	1	0	1	0	7
Finland (Hellman)	1	1	0	0	0	1	0	1	4

Sheet B	1	2	3	4	5	6	7	8	Final
Czech Republic (Musílek)	0	4	2	3	1	0	1	0	11
China (Wang) 🔨	1	0	0	0	0	1	0	2	4

Sheet C	1	2	3	4	5	6	7	8	Final
Poland (Sondej) 🔨	1	0	0	0	3	1	0	0	5
Russia (Romanov)	0	2	4	2	0	0	3	1	12

=== Draw 9 ===
Tuesday, November 18, 9:00

Sheet A	1	2	3	4	5	6	7	8	Final
China (Wang) 🔨	2	0	2	1	2	0	2	0	9
Slovakia (Duris)	0	1	0	0	0	2	0	1	4

Sheet B	1	2	3	4	5	6	7	8	Final
Japan (Nakajima) 🔨	3	2	2	1	1	1	0	1	11
Poland (Sondej)	0	0	0	0	0	0	1	0	1

Sheet C	1	2	3	4	5	6	7	8	Final
Germany (Jäger) 🔨	0	0	1	2	3	2	0	X	8
Denmark (Ørbæk)	1	1	0	0	0	0	1	X	3

Sheet D	1	2	3	4	5	6	7	8	Final
Russia (Romanov) 🔨	2	0	5	0	2	1	2	X	12
Finland (Hellman)	0	1	0	2	0	0	0	X	3

=== Draw 10 ===
Tuesday, November 18, 13:30

Sheet A	1	2	3	4	5	6	7	8	EE	Final
Finland (Hellman) 🔨	0	1	1	0	4	0	3	0	0	9
Japan (Nakajima)	1	0	0	2	0	4	0	2	1	10

Sheet B	1	2	3	4	5	6	7	8	Final
Wales (Preston)	0	4	0	0	2	0	0	0	6
Denmark (Ørbæk)	1	0	4	3	0	1	1	1	11

Sheet C	1	2	3	4	5	6	7	8	Final
Czech Republic (Musílek) 🔨	0	2	2	1	5	0	5	4	19
Poland (Sondej)	1	0	0	0	0	1	0	0	2

Sheet D	1	2	3	4	5	6	7	8	Final
China (Wang)	0	3	2	0	2	2	0	X	9
Germany (Jäger) 🔨	2	0	0	1	0	0	1	X	4

=== Draw 11 ===
Tuesday, November 18, 18:00

Sheet C	1	2	3	4	5	6	7	8	Final
Slovakia (Duris) 🔨	0	2	0	0	1	0	0	0	3
Wales (Preston)	2	0	1	2	0	3	1	3	12

Sheet D	1	2	3	4	5	6	7	8	Final
Czech Republic (Musílek)	2	0	1	0	0	4	0	0	7
Russia (Romanov)	0	2	0	3	1	0	1	1	8

=== Draw 12 ===
Wednesday, November 19, 9:00

Sheet A	1	2	3	4	5	6	7	8	Final
Denmark (Ørbæk) 🔨	0	0	1	0	0	1	2	X	4
Czech Republic (Musílek)	1	2	0	1	1	0	0	X	5

Sheet B	1	2	3	4	5	6	7	8	Final
Slovakia (Duris)	0	0	2	0	1	0	0	X	3
Japan (Nakajima) 🔨	1	2	0	1	0	2	2	X	8

Sheet C	1	2	3	4	5	6	7	8	Final
China (Wang) 🔨	1	0	0	0	0	1	X	X	2
Russia (Romanov)	0	2	1	1	2	0	X	X	6

Sheet D	1	2	3	4	5	6	7	8	Final
Wales (Preston)	0	0	1	0	0	2	X	X	3
Poland (Sondej) 🔨	2	2	0	5	1	0	X	X	10

=== Draw 13 ===
Wednesday, November 19, 13:30

Sheet A	1	2	3	4	5	6	7	8	Final
Poland (Sondej)	0	1	0	2	0	0	0	1	4
Finland (Hellman) 🔨	1	0	1	0	3	2	1	0	8

Sheet B	1	2	3	4	5	6	7	8	Final
Russia (Romanov)	0	0	3	4	2	1	1	1	12
Wales (Preston) 🔨	4	1	0	0	0	0	0	0	5

Sheet C	1	2	3	4	5	6	7	8	Final
Germany (Jäger)	0	2	0	5	0	2	2	X	11
Czech Republic (Musílek) 🔨	1	0	2	0	1	0	0	X	4

Sheet D	1	2	3	4	5	6	7	8	Final
Slovakia (Duris) 🔨	0	1	1	2	0	0	1	0	5
Denmark (Ørbæk)	2	0	0	0	2	1	0	5	10

== Playoffs ==
Second Place Game
2	Russia	1
4	China Q	13

Semifinals
1	Germany Q	6
2	Russia	5
3	Czech Republic	2
4	China	11

=== 1 vs. 2 ===
Thursday, November 20, 11:30

Team	1	2	3	4	5	6	7	8	Final
Germany (Jäger) 🔨	0	0	1	3	1	1	0	0	6
Russia (Romanov)	1	1	0	0	0	0	2	1	5

Germany is qualified to participate in the worlds
Russia moves to Second Place Game

=== 3 vs. 4 ===
Thursday, November 20, 11:30

Sheet C	1	2	3	4	5	6	7	8	Final
Czech Republic (Musílek) 🔨	2	0	0	0	0	0	0	X	2
China (Wang)	0	5	2	1	1	1	1	X	11

Russia advances to Second Place Game

=== Second Place Game ===
Thursday, November 20, 15:30 Loser of 1 vs. 2 plays against Winner of 3 vs. 4 for the second qualification spot.

Team	1	2	3	4	5	6	7	8	Final
Russia (Romanov) 🔨	0	0	0	0	0	0	1	X	1
China (Wang)	2	2	3	2	1	3	0	X	13

China qualifies to participate in the worlds
