= Mats-Ola Engborg =

Swedish wheelchair curler (born 1957)

- Curler
- Born: 1 May 1957 (age 69)

Team
- Curling club: Jönköpings CK, Jönköping

Curling career
- Member Association: Sweden
- World Wheelchair Championship: 1 (2020)
- Paralympic: 2 (2018, 2022)
Medal record
Wheelchair curling
Winter Paralympics
| Silver medal – second place | 2022 Beijing | Mixed team |
World Wheelchair Championship
| Bronze medal – third place | 2020 Wetzikon |

Mats-Ola Einar Engborg (born 1 May 1957) is a Swedish wheelchair curler.

== Career ==
He participated at the 2018 Winter Paralympics where Swedish team finished on tenth place.

== Teams ==
| Season | Skip | Third | Second | Lead | Alternate | Coach | Events |
|---|---|---|---|---|---|---|---|
| 2014–15 | Viljo Petersson-Dahl | Mats-Ola Engborg | Sara Lang | Tommy Andersson | Jenny Sjöstrand | Mikael Petersson | SWhCC 2015 (silver) |
| 2015–16 | Viljo Petersson-Dahl | Mats-Ola Engborg | Sara Lang | Tommy Andersson | | | SWhCC 2016 (silver) |
| 2016–17 | Viljo Petersson-Dahl | Sara Lang | Mats-Ola Engborg | Tommy Andersson | | Mikael Petersson | SWhCC 2017 (bronze) |
| 2017–18 | Viljo Petersson-Dahl | Mats-Ola Engborg | Sebastian Blomberg | Tommy Andersson | | | SWhCC 2018 (gold) |
| 2017–18 | Viljo Petersson-Dahl | Ronny Persson | Mats-Ola Engborg | Kristina Ulander | Zandra Reppe | Peter Narup, Mia Boman | WPG 2018 (10th) |
| 2018–19 | Viljo Petersson-Dahl | Kristina Ulander | Mats-Ola Engborg | Zandra Reppe | Sebastian Blomberg | Alison Kreviazuk | WWhCC-B 2018 (5th) |
| 2018–19 | Viljo Petersson-Dahl | Mats-Ola Engborg | Sebastian Blomberg | Tommy Andersson | | | SWhCC 2019 (bronze) |
| 2019–20 | Viljo Petersson-Dahl | Mats-Ola Engborg | Sebastian Blomberg | Tommy Andersson | | | SWhCC 2020 (gold) |
| 2019–20 | Viljo Petersson-Dahl | Mats-Ola Engborg | Ronny Persson | Kristina Ulander | Zandra Reppe | Alison Kreviazuk | WWhCC-B 2019 (silver); WWhCC 2020 (bronze) |
