= 2009 World Wheelchair Curling Championship =

- Host city: Vancouver, British Columbia, Canada
- Arena: Vancouver Paralympic Centre
- Dates: February 21–28
- Winner: Canada
- Skip: Jim Armstrong
- Third: Darryl Neighbour
- Second: Ina Forrest
- Lead: Chris Sobkowicz
- Alternate: Sonja Gaudet
- Coach: Joe Rea
- Finalist: Sweden (Jalle Jungnell)

The 2009 World Wheelchair Curling Championship was held from February 21–28 at the Vancouver Paralympic Centre in Vancouver, British Columbia, Canada. In the final

Teams participating in the 2009 World Wheelchair Curling Championship earned qualification points from this event for the Winter Paralympic Games in Vancouver in 2010.

== Qualification ==
- Canada (Host country)
- Top seven finishers from the 2008 World Wheelchair Curling Championship (not including host):
  - South Korea
  - Norway
  - United States
  - Italy
  - Sweden
  - Scotland
  - Switzerland
- Top teams from qualifying event:
  - Germany
  - China

=== Qualification event ===
Two teams outside of the top finishers qualified from a qualifying event held in November 2008 in Prague, Czech Republic.

== Teams ==
| Canada | China | Germany | Italy | South Korea |
|---|---|---|---|---|
| Skip: Jim Armstrong Third: Darryl Neighbour; Second: Ina Forrest; Lead: Chris Sobkowicz; Alternate: Sonja Gaudet; Coach: Joe Rea | Skip: Wang Haitao Third: Liu Wei; Second: Xu Guangqin; Lead: He Jun; Alternate: Liu Chunyu; Coach: Li Hongchen | Skip: Jens Jäger Third: Marcus Sieger; Second: Jens Gäbel; Lead: Caren Totzauer; Alternate: Astrid Hoer; Coach: Helmar Erlewein | Skip: Andrea Tabanelli Third: Egidio Marchese; Second: Emanuele Spelorzi; Lead: Lucrezia Celentano; Alternate: Gabriele Dallapiccola; Coach: Mauro Maino | Skip: Kim Hak-sung Third: Park Kil-woo; Second: Kim Myung-jin; Lead: Cho Yang-hyun; Alternate: Kang Mi-suk; Coach: Hong Jun-pyo |
| Norway | Scotland | Sweden | Switzerland | United States |
| Skip: Rune Lorentsen Third: Geir Arne Skogstad; Second: Jostein Stordahl; Lead: Anne Mette Samdal; Alternate: Lene Tystad; Coach: Thoralf Hognestad | Skip: Michael McCreadie Third: Aileen Neilson; Second: Tom Killin; Lead: James Sellar; Alternate: Rosemary Lenton; Coaches: Tom Pendreigh, Sheila Swan | Skip: Jalle Jungnell Third: Glenn Ikonen; Second: Patrik Burman; Lead: Anette Wilhelm; Coaches: Thomas Wilhelm, Patrik Kihlström | Skip: Manfred Bollinger Third: Martin Bieri; Second: Daniel Meyer; Lead: Anton Kehrli; Alternate: Melanie Villars; Coaches: Anton Ruesser, Nadia Röthlisberger-Raspe | Skip: Augusto Perez Third: James Pierce; Second: James Joseph; Lead: Jacqueline Kapinowski; Alternate: Patrick McDonald; Coach: Steve Brown |

== Round robin standings ==
| Country | Skip | W | L |
| Germany | Jens Jäger | 7 | 2 |
| Sweden | Jalle Jungnell | 6 | 3 |
| Canada | Jim Armstrong | 5 | 4 |
| United States | Augusto Perez | 5 | 4 |
| China | Wang Haitao | 4 | 5 |
| Italy | Andrea Tabanelli | 4 | 5 |
| South Korea | Kim Hak-sung | 4 | 5 |
| Norway | Rune Lorentsen | 4 | 5 |
| Scotland | Michael McCreadie | 4 | 5 |
| Switzerland | Manfred Bollinger | 2 | 7 |

== Results ==
=== Draw 1 ===
Saturday, February 21, 12:30

| Sheet A | 1 | 2 | 3 | 4 | 5 | 6 | 7 | 8 | Final |
| Italy (Tabanelli) 🔨 | 0 | 0 | 0 | 2 | 0 | 0 | 3 | 0 | 5 |
| Germany (Jäger) | 1 | 1 | 1 | 0 | 1 | 3 | 0 | 2 | 9 |

| Sheet B | 1 | 2 | 3 | 4 | 5 | 6 | 7 | 8 | Final |
| Switzerland (Bollinger) 🔨 | 1 | 1 | 0 | 1 | 1 | 0 | 0 | 0 | 4 |
| Sweden (Jungnell) | 0 | 0 | 1 | 0 | 0 | 3 | 4 | 1 | 9 |

| Sheet C | 1 | 2 | 3 | 4 | 5 | 6 | 7 | 8 | Final |
| China (Wang) | 3 | 1 | 0 | 0 | 0 | 1 | 1 | 0 | 6 |
| United States (Perez) 🔨 | 0 | 0 | 1 | 0 | 1 | 0 | 0 | 1 | 3 |

| Sheet D | 1 | 2 | 3 | 4 | 5 | 6 | 7 | 8 | Final |
| Scotland (McCreadle) | 0 | 0 | 1 | 1 | 0 | 0 | 0 | X | 2 |
| Canada (Armstrong) 🔨 | 3 | 2 | 0 | 0 | 3 | 1 | 1 | X | 10 |

=== Draw 2 ===
Saturday, February 21, 12:30

| Sheet A | 1 | 2 | 3 | 4 | 5 | 6 | 7 | 8 | EE | Final |
| Norway (Lorentsen) 🔨 | 0 | 1 | 2 | 0 | 1 | 1 | 0 | 0 | 0 | 5 |
| South Korea (Kim) | 1 | 0 | 0 | 2 | 0 | 0 | 1 | 1 | 1 | 6 |

| Sheet B | 1 | 2 | 3 | 4 | 5 | 6 | 7 | 8 | Final |
| China (Wang) | 1 | 1 | 1 | 0 | 1 | 2 | 1 | 1 | 8 |
| Canada (Armstrong) 🔨 | 0 | 0 | 0 | 3 | 0 | 0 | 0 | 0 | 3 |

| Sheet C | 1 | 2 | 3 | 4 | 5 | 6 | 7 | 8 | Final |
| Germany (Jäger) 🔨 | 0 | 0 | 1 | 3 | 3 | 2 | 1 | X | 10 |
| Switzerland (Bollinger) | 1 | 1 | 0 | 0 | 0 | 0 | 0 | X | 2 |

| Sheet D | 1 | 2 | 3 | 4 | 5 | 6 | 7 | 8 | Final |
| Sweden (Jungnell) 🔨 | 0 | 1 | 0 | 2 | 2 | 0 | 2 | X | 7 |
| Italy (Tabanelli) | 2 | 0 | 5 | 0 | 0 | 3 | 0 | X | 10 |

=== Draw 3 ===
Sunday, February 22, 12:30

| Sheet A | 1 | 2 | 3 | 4 | 5 | 6 | 7 | 8 | Final |
| Scotland (McCreadle) 🔨 | 0 | 0 | 1 | 0 | 2 | 0 | 3 | X | 6 |
| United States (Perez) | 1 | 3 | 0 | 2 | 0 | 4 | 0 | X | 10 |

| Sheet B | 1 | 2 | 3 | 4 | 5 | 6 | 7 | 8 | Final |
| South Korea (Kim) 🔨 | 0 | 2 | 0 | 1 | 0 | 0 | 0 | X | 3 |
| Germany (Jäger) | 3 | 0 | 1 | 0 | 2 | 1 | 1 | X | 8 |

| Sheet C | 1 | 2 | 3 | 4 | 5 | 6 | 7 | 8 | Final |
| Italy (Tabanelli) | 1 | 0 | 1 | 3 | 0 | 3 | 1 | X | 9 |
| Canada (Armstrong) 🔨 | 0 | 2 | 0 | 0 | 3 | 0 | 0 | X | 5 |

| Sheet D | 1 | 2 | 3 | 4 | 5 | 6 | 7 | 8 | Final |
| Switzerland (Bollinger) 🔨 | 0 | 1 | 1 | 2 | 0 | 0 | 0 | 0 | 4 |
| Norway (Lorentsen) | 2 | 0 | 0 | 0 | 3 | 1 | 1 | 1 | 8 |

=== Draw 4 ===
Sunday, February 22, 18:00

| Sheet A | 1 | 2 | 3 | 4 | 5 | 6 | 7 | 8 | Final |
| Sweden (Jungnell) 🔨 | 2 | 1 | 0 | 1 | 1 | 1 | 0 | 0 | 6 |
| China (Wang) | 0 | 0 | 2 | 0 | 0 | 0 | 2 | 1 | 5 |

| Sheet B | 1 | 2 | 3 | 4 | 5 | 6 | 7 | 8 | Final |
| Scotland (McCreadle) | 1 | 0 | 1 | 0 | 3 | 3 | 1 | 0 | 9 |
| Norway (Lorentsen) 🔨 | 0 | 3 | 0 | 3 | 0 | 0 | 0 | 2 | 8 |

| Sheet C | 1 | 2 | 3 | 4 | 5 | 6 | 7 | 8 | Final |
| United States (Perez) | 0 | 0 | 2 | 3 | 0 | 0 | 3 | 0 | 8 |
| Germany (Jäger) 🔨 | 1 | 1 | 0 | 0 | 3 | 1 | 0 | 4 | 10 |

| Sheet D | 1 | 2 | 3 | 4 | 5 | 6 | 7 | 8 | Final |
| Italy (Tabanelli) 🔨 | 1 | 1 | 3 | 1 | 1 | 0 | 0 | X | 7 |
| South Korea (Kim) | 0 | 0 | 0 | 0 | 0 | 1 | 0 | X | 1 |

=== Draw 5 ===
Monday, February 23, 12:30

| Sheet A | 1 | 2 | 3 | 4 | 5 | 6 | 7 | 8 | Final |
| Switzerland (Bollinger) 🔨 | 1 | 0 | 2 | 0 | 0 | 1 | 0 | X | 4 |
| Canada (Armstrong) | 0 | 1 | 0 | 1 | 4 | 0 | 5 | X | 11 |

| Sheet B | 1 | 2 | 3 | 4 | 5 | 6 | 7 | 8 | Final |
| United States (Perez) | 2 | 0 | 0 | 0 | 1 | 0 | 0 | X | 3 |
| South Korea (Kim) 🔨 | 0 | 2 | 1 | 4 | 0 | 3 | 1 | X | 11 |

| Sheet C | 1 | 2 | 3 | 4 | 5 | 6 | 7 | 8 | Final |
| Sweden (Jungnell) 🔨 | 1 | 0 | 5 | 0 | 3 | 0 | 2 | X | 11 |
| Scotland (McCreadle) | 0 | 1 | 0 | 2 | 0 | 2 | 0 | X | 5 |

| Sheet D | 1 | 2 | 3 | 4 | 5 | 6 | 7 | 8 | Final |
| Norway (Lorentsen) | 1 | 0 | 2 | 0 | 1 | 3 | 1 | X | 8 |
| China (Wang) 🔨 | 0 | 1 | 0 | 2 | 0 | 0 | 0 | X | 3 |

=== Draw 6 ===
Monday, February 23, 18:00

| Sheet A | 1 | 2 | 3 | 4 | 5 | 6 | 7 | 8 | Final |
| Germany (Jäger) | 0 | 2 | 0 | 2 | 1 | 0 | 2 | X | 7 |
| Sweden (Jungnell) 🔨 | 3 | 0 | 4 | 0 | 0 | 5 | 0 | X | 12 |

| Sheet B | 1 | 2 | 3 | 4 | 5 | 6 | 7 | 8 | Final |
| Italy (Tabanelli) | 1 | 3 | 0 | 0 | 1 | 0 | 2 | X | 7 |
| Switzerland (Bollinger) 🔨 | 0 | 0 | 1 | 1 | 0 | 2 | 0 | X | 4 |

| Sheet C | 1 | 2 | 3 | 4 | 5 | 6 | 7 | 8 | Final |
| South Korea (Kim) 🔨 | 2 | 0 | 0 | 1 | 0 | 2 | 0 | 0 | 5 |
| China (Wang) | 0 | 1 | 2 | 0 | 1 | 0 | 2 | 1 | 7 |

| Sheet D | 1 | 2 | 3 | 4 | 5 | 6 | 7 | 8 | Final |
| Canada (Armstrong) 🔨 | 0 | 0 | 1 | 0 | 1 | 0 | 1 | 0 | 3 |
| United States (Perez) | 1 | 1 | 0 | 1 | 0 | 1 | 0 | 2 | 6 |

=== Draw 7 ===
Tuesday, February 24, 12:30

| Sheet A | 1 | 2 | 3 | 4 | 5 | 6 | 7 | 8 | Final |
| South Korea (Kim) 🔨 | 1 | 0 | 1 | 0 | 0 | 3 | 0 | 1 | 6 |
| Scotland (McCreadle) | 0 | 1 | 0 | 1 | 1 | 0 | 2 | 0 | 5 |

| Sheet B | 1 | 2 | 3 | 4 | 5 | 6 | 7 | 8 | Final |
| Germany (Jäger) 🔨 | 0 | 2 | 1 | 0 | 1 | 1 | 0 | X | 5 |
| China (Wang) | 1 | 0 | 0 | 1 | 0 | 0 | 1 | X | 3 |

| Sheet C | 1 | 2 | 3 | 4 | 5 | 6 | 7 | 8 | Final |
| Norway (Lorentsen) 🔨 | 0 | 2 | 0 | 2 | 0 | 2 | 0 | 0 | 6 |
| Sweden (Jungnell) | 1 | 0 | 1 | 0 | 2 | 0 | 4 | 2 | 10 |

| Sheet D | 1 | 2 | 3 | 4 | 5 | 6 | 7 | 8 | EE | Final |
| United States (Perez) 🔨 | 0 | 2 | 0 | 1 | 1 | 0 | 0 | 1 | 3 | 8 |
| Italy (Tabanelli) | 1 | 0 | 2 | 0 | 0 | 1 | 1 | 0 | 0 | 5 |

=== Draw 8 ===
Tuesday, February 24, 18:00

| Sheet A | 1 | 2 | 3 | 4 | 5 | 6 | 7 | 8 | Final |
| United States (Perez) | 0 | 1 | 0 | 1 | 1 | 1 | 0 | 1 | 5 |
| Switzerland (Bollinger) 🔨 | 3 | 0 | 1 | 0 | 0 | 0 | 3 | 0 | 7 |

| Sheet B | 1 | 2 | 3 | 4 | 5 | 6 | 7 | 8 | Final |
| Norway (Lorentsen) | 0 | 0 | 0 | 0 | 4 | 6 | 1 | X | 11 |
| Italy (Tabanelli) 🔨 | 1 | 1 | 1 | 2 | 0 | 0 | 0 | X | 5 |

| Sheet C | 1 | 2 | 3 | 4 | 5 | 6 | 7 | 8 | Final |
| Canada (Armstrong) 🔨 | 2 | 0 | 3 | 2 | 1 | 1 | 0 | X | 9 |
| South Korea (Kim) | 0 | 3 | 0 | 0 | 0 | 0 | 1 | X | 4 |

| Sheet D | 1 | 2 | 3 | 4 | 5 | 6 | 7 | 8 | Final |
| Germany (Jäger) 🔨 | 1 | 3 | 2 | 0 | 1 | 0 | 2 | X | 9 |
| Scotland (McCreadle) | 0 | 0 | 0 | 1 | 0 | 1 | 0 | X | 2 |

=== Draw 9 ===
Wednesday, February 25, 12:30

| Sheet A | 1 | 2 | 3 | 4 | 5 | 6 | 7 | 8 | Final |
| Germany (Jäger) 🔨 | 0 | 0 | 0 | 0 | 1 | 0 | 2 | 1 | 4 |
| Norway (Lorentsen) | 0 | 0 | 0 | 0 | 0 | 1 | 0 | 0 | 1 |

| Sheet B | 1 | 2 | 3 | 4 | 5 | 6 | 7 | 8 | Final |
| Canada (Armstrong) 🔨 | 0 | 2 | 1 | 1 | 1 | 0 | 0 | 1 | 6 |
| Sweden (Jungnell) | 1 | 0 | 0 | 0 | 0 | 1 | 1 | 0 | 3 |

| Sheet C | 1 | 2 | 3 | 4 | 5 | 6 | 7 | 8 | Final |
| Scotland (McCreadle) 🔨 | 0 | 3 | 0 | 4 | 1 | 1 | 1 | X | 10 |
| Italy (Tabanelli) | 1 | 0 | 1 | 0 | 0 | 0 | 0 | X | 2 |

| Sheet D | 1 | 2 | 3 | 4 | 5 | 6 | 7 | 8 | Final |
| China (Wang) | 0 | 0 | 0 | 1 | 1 | 0 | 0 | 0 | 2 |
| Switzerland (Bollinger) 🔨 | 1 | 1 | 1 | 0 | 0 | 1 | 1 | 2 | 7 |

=== Draw 10 ===
Wednesday, February 25, 18:00

| Sheet B | 1 | 2 | 3 | 4 | 5 | 6 | 7 | 8 | Final |
| Switzerland (Bollinger) 🔨 | 0 | 1 | 0 | 0 | 0 | 1 | 1 | X | 3 |
| Scotland (McCreadle) | 1 | 0 | 4 | 3 | 1 | 0 | 0 | X | 9 |

| Sheet C | 1 | 2 | 3 | 4 | 5 | 6 | 7 | 8 | Final |
| United States (Perez) 🔨 | 0 | 3 | 3 | 1 | 0 | 2 | 0 | 1 | 10 |
| Norway (Lorentsen) | 0 | 0 | 0 | 0 | 2 | 0 | 3 | 0 | 5 |

| Sheet D | 1 | 2 | 3 | 4 | 5 | 6 | 7 | 8 | Final |
| South Korea (Kim) 🔨 | 2 | 2 | 0 | 0 | 0 | 3 | 0 | X | 7 |
| Sweden (Jungnell) | 0 | 0 | 4 | 1 | 3 | 0 | 3 | X | 11 |

=== Draw 11 ===
Thursday, February 26, 9:00

| Sheet A | 1 | 2 | 3 | 4 | 5 | 6 | 7 | 8 | Final |
| China (Wang) | 0 | 1 | 1 | 0 | 2 | 2 | 2 | 0 | 8 |
| Italy (Tabanelli) 🔨 | 1 | 0 | 0 | 1 | 0 | 0 | 0 | 0 | 2 |

| Sheet D | 1 | 2 | 3 | 4 | 5 | 6 | 7 | 8 | Final |
| Canada (Armstrong) 🔨 | 0 | 2 | 0 | 3 | 0 | 0 | 2 | 0 | 7 |
| Germany (Jäger) | 0 | 0 | 2 | 0 | 1 | 0 | 0 | 1 | 4 |

=== Draw 12 ===
Thursday, February 26, 14:30

| Sheet A | 1 | 2 | 3 | 4 | 5 | 6 | 7 | 8 | Final |
| Canada (Armstrong) | 0 | 1 | 0 | 0 | 1 | 0 | 0 | X | 2 |
| Norway (Lorentsen) 🔨 | 0 | 0 | 1 | 1 | 0 | 1 | 2 | X | 5 |

| Sheet B | 1 | 2 | 3 | 4 | 5 | 6 | 7 | 8 | Final |
| Sweden (Jungnell) 🔨 | 1 | 0 | 0 | 1 | 0 | 0 | 0 | 0 | 2 |
| United States (Perez) | 0 | 1 | 2 | 0 | 0 | 2 | 1 | 1 | 7 |

| Sheet C | 1 | 2 | 3 | 4 | 5 | 6 | 7 | 8 | Final |
| Switzerland (Bollinger) | 0 | 0 | 0 | 1 | 0 | 1 | 1 | X | 3 |
| South Korea (Kim) 🔨 | 2 | 2 | 1 | 0 | 2 | 0 | 0 | X | 7 |

| Sheet D | 1 | 2 | 3 | 4 | 5 | 6 | 7 | 8 | Final |
| Scotland (McCreadle) | 2 | 2 | 0 | 0 | 1 | 0 | 1 | 0 | 6 |
| China (Wang) 🔨 | 0 | 0 | 1 | 2 | 0 | 0 | 0 | 2 | 5 |

== Ranking Tiebreakers ==
=== Round 1 ===
Thursday, February 26, 20:00

| Sheet D | 1 | 2 | 3 | 4 | 5 | 6 | 7 | 8 | Final |
| Scotland (McCreadle) 🔨 | 2 | 0 | 0 | 3 | 1 | 0 | 4 | X | 10 |
| Norway (Lorentsen) | 0 | 1 | 2 | 0 | 0 | 0 | 0 | X | 3 |

=== Round 2 ===
Friday, February 27, 9:00

| Sheet A | 1 | 2 | 3 | 4 | 5 | 6 | 7 | 8 | Final |
| South Korea (Kim) | 0 | 1 | 2 | 0 | 1 | 0 | 0 | 2 | 6 |
| China (Wang) 🔨 | 2 | 0 | 0 | 1 | 0 | 1 | 1 | 0 | 5 |

| Sheet B | 1 | 2 | 3 | 4 | 5 | 6 | 7 | 8 | Final |
| Norway (Lorentsen) 🔨 | 0 | 1 | 0 | 3 | 0 | 1 | 2 | 2 | 9 |
| Italy (Tabanelli) | 1 | 0 | 1 | 0 | 2 | 0 | 0 | 0 | 4 |

=== Round 3 ===
Friday, February 27, 14:30

| Sheet E | 1 | 2 | 3 | 4 | 5 | 6 | 7 | 8 | Final |
| China (Wang) 🔨 | 1 | 1 | 0 | 3 | 1 | 0 | 0 | 0 | 6 |
| Italy (Tabanelli) | 0 | 0 | 1 | 0 | 0 | 1 | 1 | 1 | 4 |

== Playoffs ==
Page playoff system
1 | Germany | 6
2 | Sweden | 7
3 | United States | 2
4 | Canada | 9

Semifinal
1 | Germany | 4
4 | Canada | 10

Gold Medal Game
2 | Sweden | 2
4 | Canada | 9

| Bronze Medal Game |
| 1 | Germany | 6 |
| 3 | United States | 4 |

=== 1 vs. 2 ===
Friday, February 27, 20:00

| Sheet A | 1 | 2 | 3 | 4 | 5 | 6 | 7 | 8 | Final |
| Germany (Jäger) | 0 | 0 | 0 | 2 | 0 | 1 | 0 | 3 | 6 |
| Sweden (Jungnell) 🔨 | 1 | 1 | 1 | 0 | 2 | 0 | 2 | 0 | 7 |

=== 3 vs. 4 ===
Friday, February 27, 20:00

| Sheet D | 1 | 2 | 3 | 4 | 5 | 6 | 7 | 8 | Final |
| United States (Perez) 🔨 | 1 | 0 | 1 | 0 | 0 | 0 | 0 | X | 2 |
| Canada (Armstrong) | 0 | 1 | 0 | 2 | 1 | 2 | 3 | X | 9 |

=== Semifinal ===
Saturday, February 28, 9:00

| Sheet B | 1 | 2 | 3 | 4 | 5 | 6 | 7 | 8 | Final |
| Canada (Armstrong) | 1 | 0 | 0 | 3 | 2 | 0 | 1 | 3 | 10 |
| Germany (Jäger) 🔨 | 0 | 2 | 1 | 0 | 0 | 1 | 0 | 0 | 4 |

=== Bronze medal game ===
Saturday, February 28, 14:30

| Sheet C | 1 | 2 | 3 | 4 | 5 | 6 | 7 | 8 | Final |
| Germany (Jäger) 🔨 | 1 | 0 | 0 | 1 | 0 | 2 | 0 | 2 | 6 |
| United States (Perez) | 0 | 1 | 1 | 0 | 1 | 0 | 1 | 0 | 4 |

=== Gold medal game ===
Saturday, February 28, 14:30

| Sheet B | 1 | 2 | 3 | 4 | 5 | 6 | 7 | 8 | Final |
| Canada (Armstrong) | 2 | 1 | 0 | 2 | 0 | 2 | 2 | X | 9 |
| Sweden (Jungnell) 🔨 | 0 | 0 | 1 | 0 | 1 | 0 | 0 | X | 2 |

2009 World Wheelchair Curling Championship
(Canada)
Canada
1st title
