= Ronny Persson =

Swedish para alpine skier and wheelchair curler

- Curler
- Born: 11 August 1966 (age 60); Kramfors, Sweden

Team
- Curling club: Härnösands CK, Härnösand

Curling career
- Member Association: Sweden
- World Wheelchair Championship: 3 (2020, 2024, 2025)
- Paralympic: 3 (2018, 2022, 2026)
Medal record
Representing Sweden
Winter Paralympics
Alpine skiing
Bronze medal – third place	1998 Nagano	Downhill LW10
Silver medal – second place	2002 Salt Lake City	Slalom LW10
Silver medal – second place	2002 Salt Lake City	Giant slalom LW10
Silver medal – second place	2002 Salt Lake City	Super-G LW10
Bronze medal – third place	2002 Salt Lake City	Downhill LW10
Wheelchair curling
Silver medal – second place	2022 Beijing	Mixed team
Bronze medal – third place	2026 Milano Cortina	Mixed team
World Wheelchair Championship
Bronze medal – third place	2020 Wetzikon

Bo Ronny Michael Persson (born 11 August 1966) is a Swedish para alpine skier and wheelchair curler.

== Sports career ==
As a para-alpine skier (LW10 class: sitting, paraplegia with no or some upper abdominal function and no functional sitting balance) he participated at the 1998 Winter Paralympics (won a bronze medal in downhill) and at the 2002 Winter Paralympics (won three silver medals - in slalom, giant slalom and super-G - and a bronze medal in downhill).

Before the 2006 Winter Paralympics, the idea was that Ronny would end his alpine career by winning a Paralympic gold, which he did at most of the World Cups. But an injury that led to a serious infection and sepsis put an end to these plans.

After some years without sport, he started wheelchair curling at 2013.

As a wheelchair curler he participated in the 2018 Winter Paralympics where Swedish team finished on tenth place.

He was a Swedish flag bearer at the 2018 Winter Paralympics opening ceremony.

In 2004 he had a nomination for the Laureus World Sportsperson of the Year with Disability Award.

== Teams ==
Season	Skip	Third	Second	Lead	Alternate	Coach	Events
2013–14	Jalle Jungnell	Glenn Ikonen	Patrik Kallin	Ronny Persson			SWhCC 2014 (bronze)
2014–15	Patrik Kallin	Kristina Ulander	Ronny Persson	Anette Wilhelm			SWhCC 2015 (gold)
2014–15	Jalle Jungnell	Patrik Kallin	Ronny Persson	Kristina Ulander	Zandra Reppe	Mats Mabergs	WWhCC 2015 (9th)
2015–16	Patrik Kallin	Kristina Ulander	Ronny Persson	Zandra Reppe	Gert Erlandsson	Mia Boman	WWhCC-B 2015 (bronze)
2015–16	Ronny Persson (fourth)	Patrik Kallin (skip)	Kristina Ulander	Gert Erlandsson			SWhCC 2016 (gold)
2016–17	Patrik Kallin	Viljo Petersson-Dahl	Ronny Persson	Kristina Ulander	Zandra Reppe	Mia Boman	WWhCC-B 2016 (7th)
2016–17	Patrik Kallin	Kristina Ulander	Ronny Persson	Gert Erlandsson			SWhCC 2017 (gold)
2017–18	Viljo Petersson-Dahl	Ronny Persson	Mats-Ola Engborg	Kristina Ulander	Zandra Reppe	Peter Narup, Mia Boman	WPG 2018 (10th)
2019–20	Kristina Ulander	Ronny Persson	Marcus Holm	Zandra Reppe			SWhCC 2020 (silver)
2019–20	Viljo Petersson-Dahl	Mats-Ola Engborg	Ronny Persson	Kristina Ulander	Zandra Reppe	Alison Kreviazuk	WWhCC-B 2019 (silver); WWhCC 2020 (bronze)
2023–24	Vilko Petersson-Dahl	Ronny Persson	Marcus Holm	Sabina Johansson	Kristina Ulander	Peter Narup	WWhCC 2024 (4th)
2024–25	Vilko Petersson-Dahl	Ronny Persson	Sabina Johansson	Kristina Ulander	Tommy Andersson	Peter Narup	WWhCC 2025 (5th)
