= Martin Schlitt =

German wheelchair curler and Paralympian

- Curler ♂
- Born: 6 September 1966 (age 60); Limburg an der Lahn

Team
- Curling club: Eintracht Frankfurt e.V., RSC Frankfurt

Curling career
- Member Association: Germany
- World Wheelchair Championship: 5 (2015, 2016, 2017)
- Paralympic: 1 (2018)

Martin Schlitt (born 6 September 1966 in Limburg an der Lahn) is a German wheelchair curler.

He participated in the 2018 Winter Paralympics where German wheelchair curling team finished on eighth place.

== Teams ==
Season	Skip	Third	Second	Lead	Alternate	Coach	Events
2011–12	Jens Jäger	Caren Totzauer	Martin Schlitt	Uwe Raschke	Heike Melchior	Bernd Weisser	WWhCQ 2011 (4th)
2012–13	Jens Jäger	Caren Totzauer	Martin Schlitt	Uwe Raschke	Christiane Steger	Bernd Weisser	WWhCQ 2012 (6th)
2014–15	Jens Jäger	Christiane Putzich	Martin Schlitt	Heike Melchior	Robert Hering	Bernd Weisser	WWhCQ 2014 (silver); WWhCC 2015 (7th)
2015–16	Jens Jäger	Christiane Putzich	Martin Schlitt	Heike Melchior	Harry Pavel	Bernd Weisser	WWhCC 2016 (8th)
2016–17	Christiane Putzich	Harry Pavel	Martin Schlitt	Heike Melchior	Christoph Gemmer	Bernd Weisser	WWhCC 2017 (9th)
2017–18	Christiane Putzich	Harry Pavel	Martin Schlitt	Heike Melchior	Wolf Meissner	Katja Schweizer	WPG 2018 (8th)
