= Wolf Meissner =

German wheelchair curler and Paralympian

- Curler ♂
- Born: 1 November 1969 (age 57); Offenbach am Main

Team
- Curling club: RSC Frankfurt

Curling career
- Member Association: Germany
- World Wheelchair Championship: 1 (2019)
- Paralympic: 1 (2018)

Wolf Meissner (born 1 November 1969 in Offenbach am Main) is a German wheelchair curler.

He participated in the 2018 Winter Paralympics where German wheelchair curling team finished on eighth place.

== Teams ==
Season	Skip	Third	Second	Lead	Alternate	Coach	Events
2017–18	Christiane Putzich	Harry Pavel	Martin Schlitt	Heike Melchior	Wolf Meissner	Katja Schweizer	WPG 2018 (8th)
2018–19	Christiane Putzich	Harry Pavel	Wolf Meissner	Heike Melchior	Melanie Kurth	Helmar Erlewein, Jamie Boutin	WWhCC 2019 (12th)
2019–20	Christiane Putzich	Burkhard Moeller	Wolf Meissner	Heike Melchior	Melanie Spielmann	Helmar Erlewein, Jamie Boutin	WhBCC 2019 (6th)
