= Harry Pavel =

German wheelchair curler and Paralympian

- Curler ♂
- Born: 6 March 1951 (age 75); Fuchsstadt

Team
- Curling club: CC Schwenningen, Villingen-Schwenningen

Curling career
- Member Association: Germany
- World Wheelchair Championship: 3 (2016, 2017, 2019)
- Paralympic: 1 (2018)
Medal record
Wheelchair curling

Harry Pavel (born 6 March 1951 in Fuchsstadt) is a German wheelchair curler.

He participated in the 2018 Winter Paralympics where German wheelchair curling team finished on eighth place.

In 2015 and 2016 he competed in Swiss Wheelchair Curling Championship, won gold medal both times.

== Teams ==
| Season | Skip | Third | Second | Lead | Alternate | Coach | Events |
|---|---|---|---|---|---|---|---|
| 2015–16 | Jens Jäger | Christiane Putzich | Martin Schlitt | Heike Melchior | Harry Pavel | Bernd Weisser | WWhCC 2016 (8th) |
| 2016–17 | Christiane Putzich | Harry Pavel | Martin Schlitt | Heike Melchior | Christoph Gemmer | Bernd Weisser | WWhCC 2017 (9th) |
| 2017–18 | Christiane Putzich | Harry Pavel | Martin Schlitt | Heike Melchior | Wolf Meissner | Katja Schweizer | WPG 2018 (8th) |
| 2018–19 | Christiane Putzich | Harry Pavel | Wolf Meissner | Heike Melchior | Melanie Kurth | Helmar Erlewein, Jamie Boutin | WWhCC 2019 (12th) |
