= Helmar Erlewein =

German curler and coach

- Curler ♂

Team
- Curling club: SC Riessersee, Garmisch-Partenkirchen

Curling career
- Member Association: Germany
- Other appearances: European Mixed Championship: 4 (2005, 2006, 2007, 2008)
Medal record
Curling
European Mixed Championship
Gold medal – first place	2008 Kitzbühel
Bronze medal – third place	2005 Canillo
Bronze medal – third place	2007 Madrid
German Men's Championship
Bronze medal – third place	2002

Helmar Erlewein is a German curler and curling coach.

At the international level, he is a 2008 European mixed curling champion and two-time European mixed bronze medallist (2005, 2007).

== Teams ==
=== Men's ===
Season	Skip	Third	Second	Lead	Events
2001–02	Rainer Schöpp	Jan-Peter Rehm	Vehbi Yanik	Helmar Erlewein	GMCC 2002 (bronze)

=== Mixed ===
Season	Skip	Third	Second	Lead	Alternate	Coach	Events
2005–06	Rainer Schöpp	Andrea Schöpp	Helmar Erlewein	Monika Wagner			EMxCC 2005 (bronze)
2006–07	Roland Jentsch	Daniela Jentsch	Uli Sutor	Marika Trettin	Helmar Erlewein		EMxCC 2006 (10th)
2007–08	Rainer Schöpp	Andrea Schöpp	Sebastian Jacoby	Marie-Therese Rotter	Helmar Erlewein		EMxCC 2007 (bronze)
2008–09	Rainer Schöpp	Andrea Schöpp	Sebastian Jacoby	Melanie Robillard	Helmar Erlewein, Monika Wagner	John Robillard	EMxCC 2008 (gold)

== Record as a coach of national teams ==
Year	Tournament, event	National team	Place
2009	2009 World Wheelchair Curling Championship	Germany (wheelchair)	3rd place, bronze medalist(s)
2010	2010 Winter Paralympics	Germany (wheelchair)	8
2011	2011 World Wheelchair Curling Championship	Germany (wheelchair)	9
2019	2019 World Wheelchair Curling Championship	Germany (wheelchair)	12
2019	2019 World Wheelchair-B Curling Championship	Germany (wheelchair)	6
