= Zandra Reppe =

Swedish Paralympic archer and curler

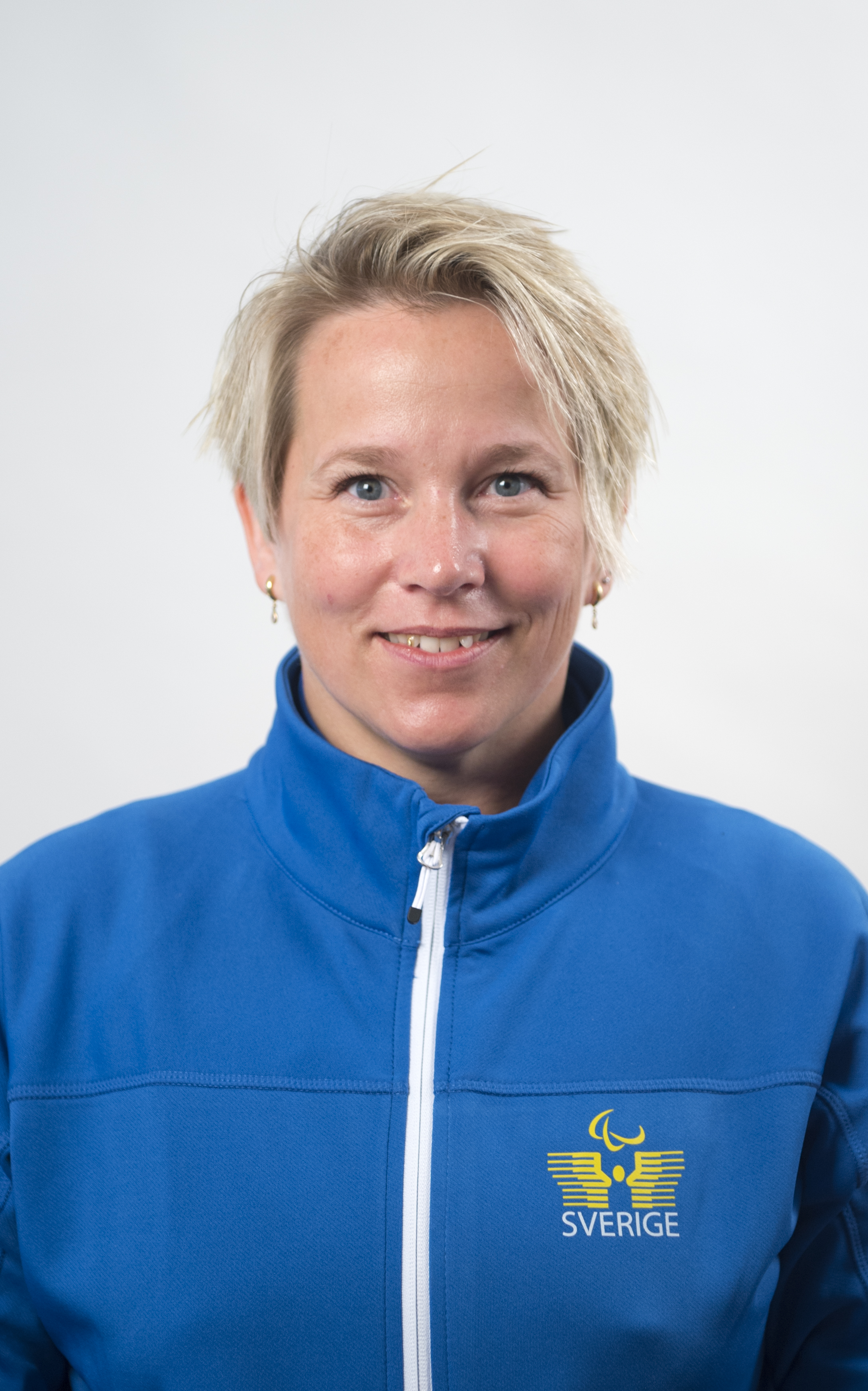

Personal information
- Full name: Zandra Marianne Reppe
- Nationality: Swedish
- Born: 23 December 1973 (age 52) Stockholm, Sweden

Sport
- Sport: Archery; Wheelchair curling
- Club: Jämtlands BK
- Coached by: Gullimar Akerlund
Medal record
Representing Sweden
Archery
World Para Archery Championships
Bronze medal – third place	2011 Turin	Women's compound open
Bronze medal – third place	2011 Turin	Mixed compound open (team)
Wheelchair Curling
Bronze medal – third place	2020 Wetzikon	Team

Zandra Reppe (born 23 December 1973) is a Swedish Paralympic archer and curler.

She has competed in the 2008 Summer Paralympics, 2012 Summer Paralympics and 2016 Summer Paralympics in Compound archery and the 2014 Winter Paralympics and 2018 Winter Paralympics in wheelchair curling.
