= Per Christensen (curling) =

Danish male curler and coach

- Curler ♂
- Born: 1 November 1955 (age 71); Frederiksberg, Denmark

Curling career
- Member Association: Denmark
Medal record
Curling

Per Christensen (born 1 November 1955 in Frederiksberg) is a Danish male curler and coach.

As a coach of Norwegian wheelchair curling team he participated in 2010.

== Record as a coach of national teams ==
Year	Tournament, event	National team	Place
2004	2004 World Wheelchair Curling Championship	Denmark (wheelchair)	8
2005	2005 World Wheelchair Curling Championship	Denmark (wheelchair)	2nd place, silver medalist(s)
2007	2007 World Wheelchair Curling Championship	Denmark (wheelchair)	9
2008	2008 World Wheelchair Curling Qualification Competition	Denmark (wheelchair)	5
2010	2010 Winter Paralympics	Norway (wheelchair)	9
2010	2010 World Wheelchair Curling Qualification Competition	Denmark (wheelchair)	7
2011	2011 World Wheelchair Curling Qualification Competition	Denmark (wheelchair)	6
2012	2012 World Wheelchair Curling Qualification Competition	Denmark (wheelchair)	9
2015	2015 World Wheelchair-B Curling Championship	Denmark (wheelchair)	8
2018	2018 World Wheelchair-B Curling Championship	Denmark (wheelchair)	10
2019	2019 World Wheelchair-B Curling Championship	Denmark (wheelchair)	8
