= Sussie Pedersen =

Danish wheelchair curler

Sussie Pedersen (born 21 July 1960, in Copenhagen; in marriage known as Sussie Nielsen) is a Danish wheelchair curler. She represents Tårnby Curling Club.

She has been in a wheelchair since 1999, when she was diagnosed with multiple sclerosis, and began wheelchair curling in 2004.

She has competed in two World Championships for Denmark, and the Paralympics in 2006. Her best result at these championships was a World Championship silver medal in 2005, where she was reserve.

Denmark took bronze in the qualification matches for the World Championships in 2008, but only two of the 10 teams that took part in the qualification series went on to the World Championships. Therefore, Denmark did not take part in the 2008 World Championships. Sussie played second in this qualification series.

Sussie is married and has two children.

== Results ==
Paralympic Games
Place	Event	Year	Location
5th	Wheelchair curling	2006	(Italy) Turin
World Wheelchair Curling Championship
Place	Event	Year	Location
Silver	Wheelchair curling	2005	(Scotland) Glasgow
9th	Wheelchair curling	2007	(Sweden) Sollefteå
