= Tårnby =

Town in Denmark

- town
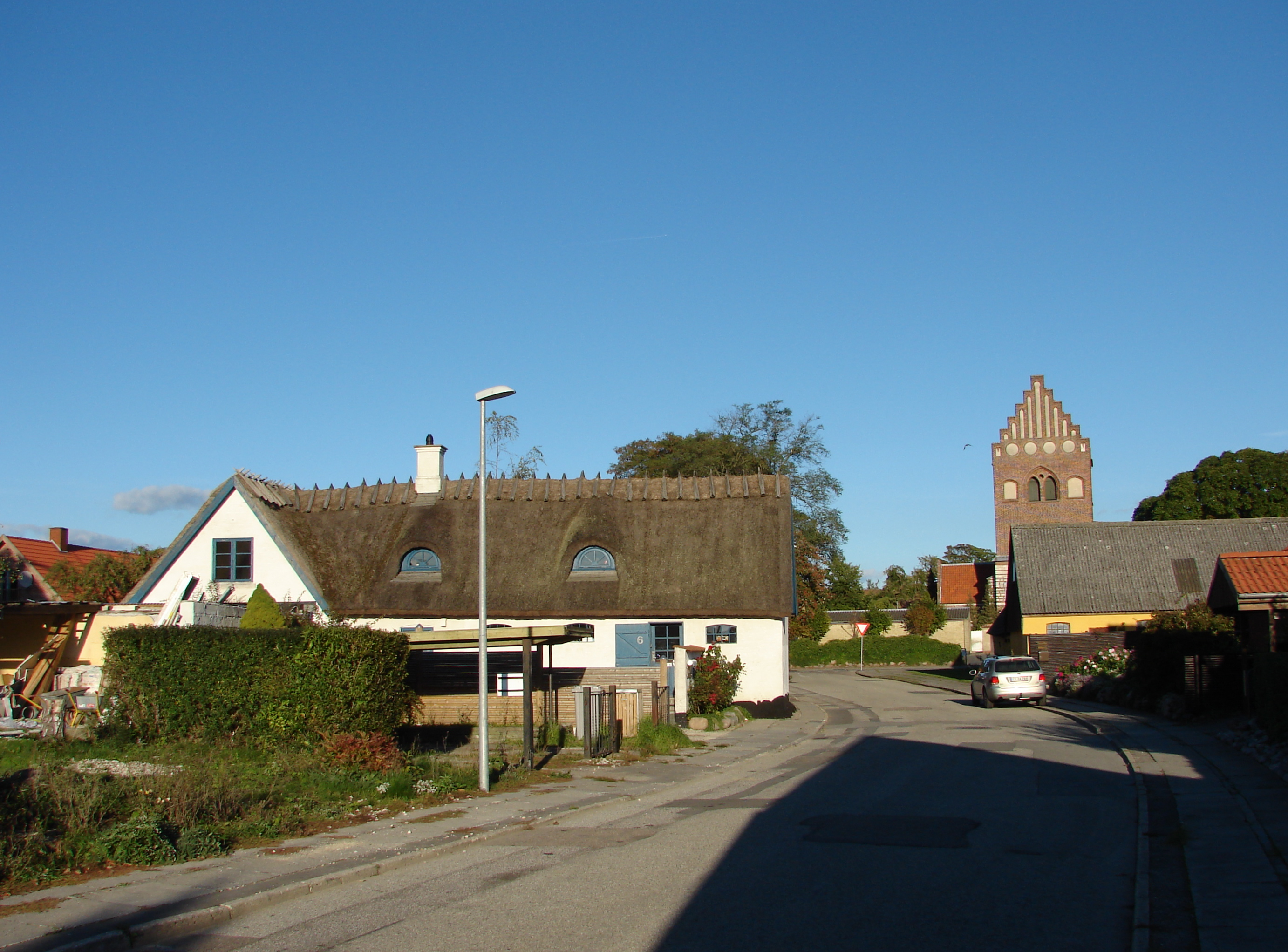
- Interactive map of Tårnby
- Coordinates: 55°37′25″N 12°36′6″E
- Country: Denmark
- Region: Capital
- Municipality: Tårnby

Tårnby (Danish pronunciation: [ˈtsʰɒːnˌpyˀ]) is a town in Denmark, the seat of Tårnby Municipality in the Capital Region of Denmark. It is located approximately 6.5 kilometres (4.0 mi) south of central Copenhagen on the island of Amager. Neighbouring settlements include the Copenhagen suburb of Sundbyvester to the north and Kastrup to the south. Copenhagen Airport is situated to the east of Tårnby. It includes the islets Saltholm and Peberholm.

== History ==
There is no clear date for the founding of Tårnby, but archaeological expeditions prior to the building of the Øresund Bridge suggest that the first traces of Tårnby originated around the 12th century around a farm from which the village grew.

In the 16th century, Danish King Christian II invited Dutch settlers to Amager. That made Tårnby, like the neighbouring city of Dragør, also have some traces of Dutch history and culture.

In 1970, Tårnby also became the administrative division of the adjacent city of Kastrup, as part of a larger reform of the Danish counties.

== Geography ==
The town is situated in the island of Amager, close to Dragør, in the southern suburbs of Copenhagen and is part of the capital's urban area. The terrain is quite flat and does not rise more than 8 meters (appr. 26 feet) above sea level. Tårnby also incorporates the islands of Saltholm and Peberholm, natural and artificial respectively, both situated in the Øresund Strait.

While Tårnby has a history of farming, it has been almost completely urbanised, leaving only small traces of farmland in the southernmost parts. The westernmost part of the municipality contains Amager Fælled, a protected wildlife and recreational area. As such, the area is primarily used for birdwatching and various recreational activities. However, in recent years urban development have limited the area significantly.

== Notable people ==
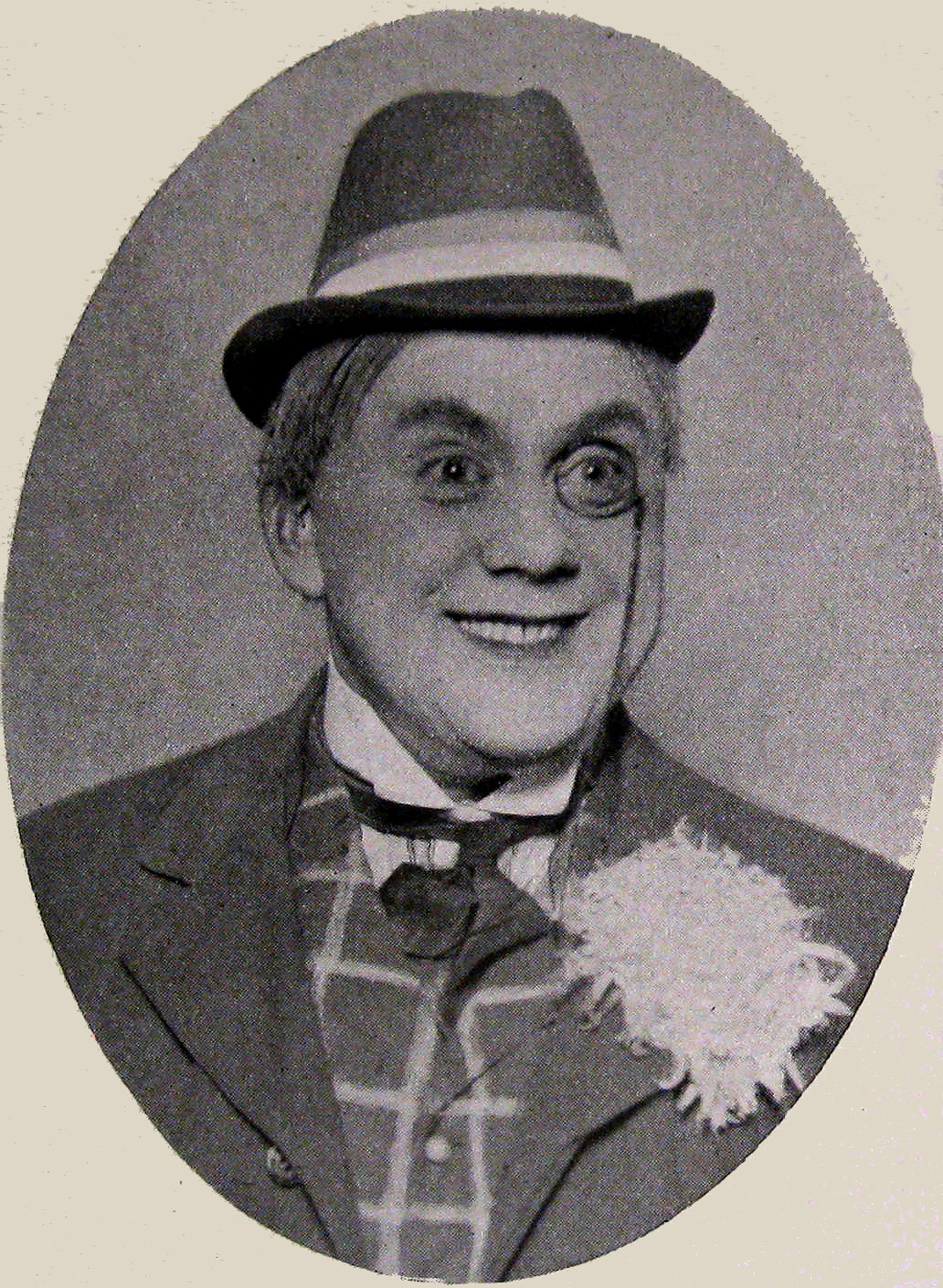
Carl Alstrup, 1909

- Carl Alstrup (1877 in Sundbyvester – 1942) a Danish actor and film director
- Rakel Helmsdal (born 1966) a Faroese writer and involved in youth theatre
- Martin Henriksen (born 1980) a Danish politician and former MP
- Peter Hummelgaard Thomsen (born 1983) a Danish politician and Minister of Employment since 2019.
- Maria Apetri (born 1985) stage name Fallulah, a Danish singer-songwriter and musician
- Morten Ristorp (born 1986), stage name Rissi, is a Danish-born American producer, composer, songwriter and musician

=== Sport ===
- Jan Heintze (born 1963) a retired Danish footballer with 564 club caps and 86 for Denmark
- Angelina Jensen (born 1973) a Danish curler
- Niki Zimling (born 1985) a retired Danish footballer with over 250 club caps and 24 for Denmark and currently the sporting director of Kolding IF
- Mads Glæsner (born 1988) a Danish freestyle swimmer, participated at the 2008 and 2012 Summer Olympics

== See also ==
- Tårnby railway station
