= Marcus Sieger =

German wheelchair curler

Personal information
- Nationality: German
- Born: 7 October 1975 (age 49)

Sport
- Country: Germany
- Sport: Wheelchair curling
- Updated on 11 February 2011

Marcus Sieger (born 7 October 1975) is a German wheelchair curler.

He competed with the German wheelchair curling team at the 2010 Winter Paralympic Games in Vancouver, British Columbia, Canada.
