= List of Paralympic medalists in wheelchair curling =

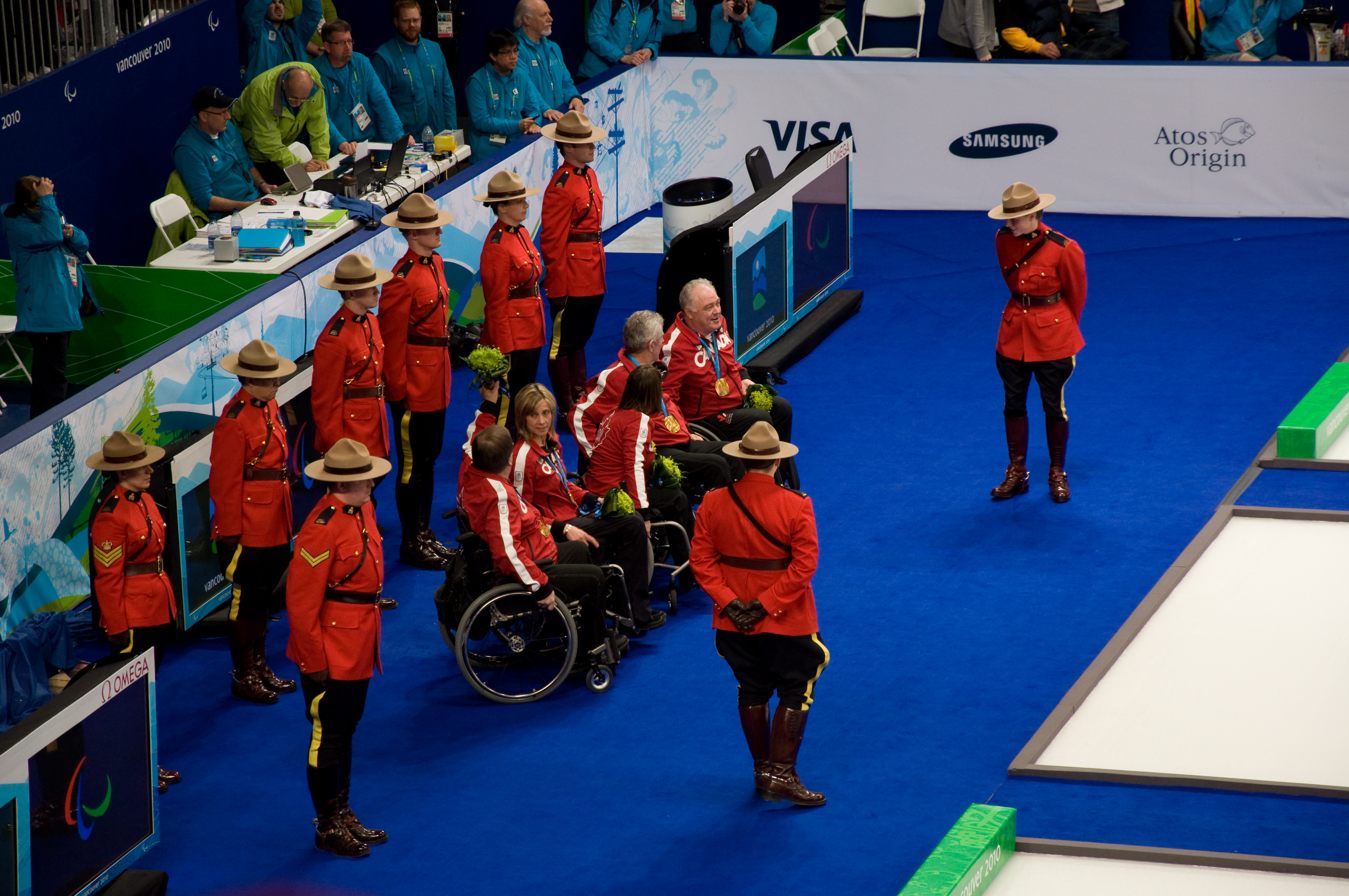
Canada, the gold medalists in the wheelchair curling tournament at the 2010 Winter Paralympics.

Wheelchair curling is a team sport that is contested at the Winter Paralympic Games.

Wheelchair curling was first included in the official programme of the 2006 Games in Turin, Italy.

In total, 70 athletes have won a medal in curling, and 1 has won four. Ina Forrest of Canada (three gold, one bronze) have won four medals.

Teams from Canada have been successful in the sport, winning medal at each Paralympics. A total of 21 medals (7 of each color) have been awarded since 2006 and have been won by teams from eight National Paralympic Committees (NPC).

== Mixed team ==
Games	Gold	Silver	Bronze
2006 Turin	Canada (CAN); Chris Daw; Gerry Austgarden; Gary Cormack; Sonja Gaudet; Karen Blachford	Great Britain (GBR); Frank Duffy; Michael McCreadie; Tom Killin; Angie Malone; Ken Dickson	Sweden (SWE); Jalle Jungnell; Glenn Ikonen; Rolf Johansson; Anette Wilhelm; Bernt Sjöberg
2010 Vancouver	Canada (CAN); Jim Armstrong; Darryl Neighbour; Ina Forrest; Sonja Gaudet; Bruno Yizek	South Korea (KOR); Kim Hak-sung; Kim Myung-jin; Cho Yang-hyun; Kang Mi-suk; Park Kil-woo	Sweden (SWE); Jalle Jungnell; Glenn Ikonen*; Patrik Burman; Anette Wilhelm; Patrik Kallin
2014 Sochi	Canada (CAN); Jim Armstrong; Dennis Thiessen; Ina Forrest; Sonja Gaudet; Mark Ideson	Russia (RUS); Andrei Smirnov; Alexander Shevchenko; Svetlana Pakhomova; Marat Romanov; Oksana Slesarenko	Great Britain (GBR); Aileen Neilson; Gregor Ewan; Bob McPherson; Jim Gault; Angie Malone
2018 Pyeongchang	China; Wang Haitao; Chen Jianxin; Liu Wei; Wang Meng; Zhang Qiang	Norway; Rune Lorentsen; Jostein Stordahl; Ole Fredrik Syversen; Sissel Løchen; Rikke Iversen	Canada; Mark Ideson; Ina Forrest; Dennis Thiessen; Marie Wright; James Anseeuw
2022 Beijing	China; Wang Haitao; Chen Jianxin; Zhang Mingliang; Yan Zhuo; Sun Yulong	Sweden; Viljo Petersson-Dahl; Ronny Persson; Mats-Ola Engborg; Kristina Ulander; Sabina Johansson	Canada; Jon Thurston; Ina Forrest; Dennis Thiessen; Mark Ideson; Collinda Joseph
2026 Milano-Cortina	Canada; Mark Ideson; Jon Thurston; Ina Forrest; Collinda Joseph; Gil Dash	China; Wang Haitao; Chen Jianxin; Zhang Mingliang; Li Nana; Zhang Qiang	Sweden; Viljo Petersson-Dahl; Ronny Persson; Sabina Johansson; Kristina Ulander; Marcus Holm

* suspended

== Mixed doubles ==
Games	Gold	Silver	Bronze
2026 Milano-Cortina	China; Wang Meng; Yang Jinqiao	South Korea; Baek Hye-jin; Lee Yong-suk	Latvia; Poļina Rožkova; Agris Lasmans

== Multiple medalists ==
Athlete	Nation	Olympics	Gold	Silver	Bronze	Total
Ina Forrest	Canada (CAN)	2010–2026	3	0	1	4
Sonja Gaudet	Canada (CAN)	2006–2014	3	0	0	3
Haitao Wang	China (CHN)	2018–2026	2	1	0	3
Jianxin Chen	China (CHN)	2018–2026	2	1	0	3
Mark Ideson	Canada (CAN)	2014–2026	2	0	1	3
Jim Armstrong	Canada (CAN)	2010–2014	2	0	0	2
Meng Wang	China (CHN)	2018–2026	2	0	0	2
Qiang Zhang	China (CHN)	2018–2026	1	1	0	2
Mingliang Zhang	China (CHN)	2022–2026	1	1	0	2
Dennis Thiessen	Canada (CAN)	2014–2018	1	0	1	2
Jon Thurston	Canada (CAN)	2022–2026	1	0	1	2
Collinda Joseph	Canada (CAN)	2022–2026	1	0	1	2
Angie Malone	Great Britain (GBR)	2006–2014	0	1	1	2
Viljo Petersson-Dahl	Sweden (SWE)	2022–2026	0	1	1	2
Ronny Persson	Sweden (SWE)	2022–2026	0	1	1	2
Sabina Johansson	Sweden (SWE)	2022–2026	0	1	1	2
Kristina Ulander	Sweden (SWE)	2022–2026	0	1	1	2
Glenn Ikonen	Sweden (SWE)	2006–2010	0	0	2	2
Jalle Jungnell	Sweden (SWE)	2006–2010	0	0	2	2
Anette Wilhelm	Sweden (SWE)	2006–2010	0	0	2	2

== See also ==
- List of Olympic medalists in curling
