= Canadian Wheelchair Curling Championship =

National championship for wheelchair curling in Canada

- Established: 2004
- 2026 host city: Boucherville, Quebec
- 2026 arena: Club de curling Boucherville
- 2026 champion: Quebec 1

Current edition
- 2026 Canadian Wheelchair Curling Championship

The Canadian Wheelchair Curling Championship is the national championship for wheelchair curling in Canada. The event has been held since 2004.

== Winners ==
Year	Team	Host
2004	Team Canada; Chris Daw, Bruce McAninch, Jim Primavera, Karen Blachford	London, Ontario
2005	Team Canada; Chris Daw, Bruce McAninch, Jim Primavera, Karen Blachford, Gerry Austgarden (alternate)	Richmond, British Columbia
2006	Team Canada; Chris Daw, Gerry Austgarden, Gary Cormack, Sonja Gaudet, Karen Blachford (alternate)	Richmond, British Columbia
2007	British Columbia; Darryl Neighbour, Frank LaBounty, Whitney Warren, Jacqueline Roy, Jim Shannon (alternate)	Ottawa, Ontario
2008	British Columbia; Jim Armstrong, Frank LaBounty, Whitney Warren, Jacqueline Roy, Vincent Miele (alternate)	Winnipeg, Manitoba
2009	British Columbia; Jim Armstrong, Frank LaBounty, Whitney Warren, Jacqueline Roy, Darryl Neighbour (alternate)	Lower Sackville, Nova Scotia
2010	(British Columbia) Host Team; Gary Cormack, Rich Green, Vince Miele, Corinne Jensen, Samantha Siu (alternate)	Kelowna, British Columbia
2011	Manitoba; Chris Sobkowicz, Dennis Thiessen, Melissa Lecuyer, George Horning, Don Kalinsky (alternate)	Edmonton, Alberta
2012	Saskatchewan; Darwin Bender, Gil Dash, Marie Wright, Larry Schrader, Lorraine Arguin (coach), Bob Capp (coach)	Thunder Bay, Ontario
2013	Quebec; Benoît Lessard, Carl Marquis, Sébastien Boisvert, Johanne Daly, Germain Tremblay (coach)	Ottawa, Ontario
2014	Manitoba; Dennis Thiessen, Mark Wherrett, Jamie Anseeuw, Melissa Lecuyer, Tom Wherrett (coach)	Boucherville, Quebec
2015	British Columbia; Gerry Austgarden, Darryl Neighbour, Frank LaBounty, Alison Duddy, Brad Burton (coach)	Boucherville, Quebec
2016	Saskatchewan; Darwin Bender, Marie Wright, Gil Dash, Larry Schrader	Regina, Saskatchewan
2017	Manitoba; Dennis Thiessen, Mark Wherrett, Jamie Anseeuw, Carolyn Lindner	Boucherville, Quebec
2018	Saskatchewan; Marie Wright, Gil Dash, Darwin Bender, Larry Schrader	Leduc, Alberta
2019	Alberta; Jack Smart, Martin Purvis, Bruno Yizek, Anne Hibberd, Wendy Frazier (alternate), Bridget Wilson (coach)	Boucherville, Quebec
2020	Cancelled due to the ongoing COVID-19 pandemic	Boucherville, Quebec
2023	Saskatchewan 1 Gil Dash, Marie Wright, Darwin Bender, Moose Gibson	Moose Jaw, Saskatchewan
2024	Saskatchewan 1 Gil Dash, Marie Wright, Moose Gibson, Sheryl Pederson	Moose Jaw, Saskatchewan
2025	Northern Ontario; Douglas Dean, Gino Sonego, Rick Bell, Lola Graham	Boucherville, Quebec
2026	Quebec 1 Carl Marquis, Sébastien Boisvert, François Lacourse, Johanne Mathieu, Noemie Gagné	Boucherville, Quebec
