= 2019 Canadian Wheelchair Curling Championship =

- Host city: Boucherville, Quebec
- Arena: Club de curling de Boucherville
- Dates: April 26 - May 1
- Winner: Alberta
- Curling club: Garrison Curling Club, Calgary
- Skip: Jack Smart
- Third: Martin Purvis
- Second: Bruno Yizek
- Lead: Anne Hibberd
- Alternate: Wendy Frazier
- Finalist: Manitoba (Dennis Thiessen)

The 2019 Canadian Wheelchair Curling Championship was held April 26 - May 1 at the Club de curling de Boucherville in Boucherville, Quebec.

== Teams ==
The teams are as follows:

Team	Skip	Third	Second	Lead	Alternate
Alberta	Jack Smart	Martin Purvis	Bruno Yizek	Anne Hibberd	Wendy Frazier
British Columbia 1	Darryl Neighbour	Bob McDonald	Gary Cormack	Janice Ing	
British Columbia 2	Gerry Austgarden	Rick Robinson	Tracy Boyd	Marney Smithies	Ina Forrest
Manitoba	Dennis Thiessen	Mark Wherrett	Jamie Anseeuw	Carolyn Lindner	Jennifer Balcaen
New Brunswick	Michael Fitzgerald	Jon Polley	Elaine Mazerolle	Kayla Todd	
Newfoundland and Labrador	Cecilia Carroll	Darlene Jackman	Felix Green	Mel Fitzgerald	
Northern Ontario	Doug Dean	Gino Sonego	Rick Bell	Lola Graham	
Nova Scotia	Trendal Hubley-Bolivar	Terry Cousineau	Keith Williams	Debbie Morgan	
Ontario 1	Jim Armstrong	Collinda Joseph	Jonathon Thurston	Reid Mulligan	
Ontario 2	Chris Rees	Shauna Petrie	Jim Law	Wayne MacDonald	
Quebec 1	Benoit Lessard	Carl Marquis	Johanne Mathieu	François Lavallée	Christine Lavallée
Quebec 2	Claude Brunet	Sébastien Boisvert	Mario Trudel	Monique Martel	Michel Pelletier
Saskatchewan 1	Marie Wright	Gil Dash	Darwin Bender	Moose Gibson	
Saskatchewan 2	Donna Ackerman	Ellis Tull	Rod Pederson	Sheryl Pederson	

== Standings ==
Final round robin standings

Key
Teams to playoffs

Pool A	Skip	W	L
Ontario 1	Jim Armstrong	5	1
Northern Ontario	Doug Dean	4	2
Saskatchewan 1	Marie Wright	4	2
British Columbia 2	Gerry Austgarden	3	3
Quebec 1	Benoit Lessard	2	4
Newfoundland and Labrador	Cecilia Carroll	2	4
Quebec 2	Claude Brunet	1	5

Pool B	Skip	W	L
Alberta	Jack Smart	4	2
Manitoba	Dennis Thiessen	4	2
Ontario 2	Chris Rees	4	2
Saskatchewan 2	Donna Ackerman	3	3
British Columbia 1	Darryl Neighbour	3	3
New Brunswick	Michael Fitzgerald	2	4
Nova Scotia	Trendal Hubley-Bolivar	1	5

== Playoffs ==
Qualification
B2	Manitoba	4
A3	Saskatchewan 1	3
A2	Northern Ontario	9
B3	Ontario 2	3

Semifinals
A1	Ontario 1	2
B2	Manitoba	10
B1	Alberta	8
A2	Northern Ontario	5

Final
B2	Manitoba	3
B1	Alberta	9
Bronze-medal game
A1	Ontario 1	6
A2	Northern Ontario	3

=== Qualification ===
Tuesday, April 30, 10:00

Team	1	2	3	4	5	6	7	8	Final
Manitoba (Thiessen)	0	1	0	1	0	0	1	1	4
Saskatchewan 1 (Wright)	0	0	1	0	0	2	0	0	3

Team	1	2	3	4	5	6	7	8	Final
Northern Ontario (Dean)	0	0	0	2	0	1	2	4	9
Ontario 2 (Rees)	1	0	1	0	1	0	0	0	3

=== Semifinal ===
Tuesday, April 30, 19:00

Team	1	2	3	4	5	6	7	8	Final
Ontario 1 (Armstrong)	0	1	0	1	0	0	X	X	2
Manitoba (Thiessen)	2	0	3	0	3	2	X	X	10

Team	1	2	3	4	5	6	7	8	Final
Alberta (Smart)	0	3	0	3	1	0	1	X	8
Northern Ontario (Dean)	1	0	4	0	0	0	0	X	5

=== Bronze-medal game ===
Wednesday, May 1, 12:00

Team	1	2	3	4	5	6	7	8	Final
Ontario 1 (Armstrong)	0	0	0	2	0	1	1	2	6
Northern Ontario (Dean)	1	0	1	0	1	0	0	0	3

=== Final ===
Wednesday, May 1, 12:00

Team	1	2	3	4	5	6	7	8	Final
Manitoba (Thiessen)	0	0	0	0	0	3	0	X	3
Alberta (Smart)	0	0	2	2	3	0	2	X	9
