= 2025 Canadian Wheelchair Curling Championship =

- Host city: Boucherville, Quebec
- Arena: Club de curling Boucherville
- Dates: April 28 – May 3
- Winner: Northern Ontario
- Curling club: Fort William CC, Thunder Bay
- Skip: Douglas Dean
- Third: Gino Sonego
- Second: Rick Bell
- Lead: Lola Graham
- Alternate: Aimee Epp
- Coach: Doug Gelmich
- Finalist: Quebec 1 (Marquis)

The 2025 Canadian Wheelchair Curling Championship was held from April 28 to May 3 at the Club de curling Boucherville in Boucherville, Quebec. This was the fifth year the event was held in Boucherville.

The event was originally scheduled to be held with a championship round that qualified three teams for the playoffs. However, on April 30, an ice storm caused play to be suspended for the day. A revised schedule saw eight teams qualify for the playoffs instead.

== Teams ==
The teams are listed as follows:

Province / Territory	Skip	Third	Second	Lead	Alternate	Locale
Alberta	Martin Purvis	Terry Fowler	Wendy Frazier	Kendra Ohama		Garrison CC, Calgary
British Columbia 1	Rick Robinson	Ina Forrest	Gerry Austgarden	Glen McDonald		Kelowna CC, Kelowna; Vernon CC, Vernon; Richmond CC, Richmond
British Columbia 2	Marney Smithies	Rob Spencer	Kim Egger	Lelainia Lloyd		Delta Thistle CC, Delta
New Brunswick	Michael Fitzgerald	Sarah Benevides	Jon Polley	Elaine Mazerolle	James O'Hara	Thistle-St. Andrews CC, Saint John
Newfoundland and Labrador	Dennis Thiessen	Felix Green	Karl Allen	Cecilia Carroll		St. John's CC, St. John's
Northern Ontario	Douglas Dean	Gino Sonego	Rick Bell	Lola Graham	Aimee Epp	Fort William CC, Thunder Bay
Nova Scotia	Laughlin Rutt	Stephen Parfitt	Harris Josey	Marieann MacEachren	Nicholas Taylor	Lakeshore CC, Lower Sackville
Ontario	Shauna Petrie	Billy Bridges	Jeff Harris	Sheri Roberts	Chris Rees	Toronto CSP Club, Toronto
Quebec 1	Carl Marquis	Johanne Mathieu	Sébastien Boisvert	Noemie Gagné	François Lacourse	CC Magog, Magog
Quebec 2	Luc Hamel	Mario Trudel	Martin Larose	Monique Martel	Annik Charron	CC Victoria, Sainte-Foy
Saskatchewan 1	Gil Dash	Marie Wright	Moose Gibson	Darwin Bender		Moose Jaw Ford CC, Moose Jaw
Saskatchewan 2	Pete Andrews	Mark Kennedy	Stephen Draude	Ashley Baerg		Sutherland CC, Saskatoon

== Round robin standings ==
Final Round Robin Standings

Key
Teams to Playoffs

Pool A	Skip	W	L	W–L	PF	PA	EW	EL	BE	SE	LSD
Quebec 2	Luc Hamel	4	1	1–0	36	25	23	14	0	11	706.1
Alberta	Martin Purvis	4	1	0–1	35	20	22	12	1	13	1455.5
British Columbia 2	Marney Smithies	3	2	1–0	29	29	19	19	0	8	1193.3
Saskatchewan 1	Gil Dash	3	2	0–1	32	23	20	17	1	10	1106.4
Ontario	Shauna Petrie	1	4	–	22	41	13	25	0	3	1427.7
New Brunswick	Michael Fitzgerald	0	5	–	19	35	13	23	2	3	463.8

Pool B	Skip	W	L	W–L	PF	PA	EW	EL	BE	SE	LSD
Quebec 1	Carl Marquis	4	1	–	32	26	18	19	0	6	992.2
Newfoundland and Labrador	Dennis Thiessen	3	2	1–1	36	30	23	17	0	9	1069.6
Northern Ontario	Douglas Dean	3	2	1–1	39	27	22	15	0	10	1136.2
British Columbia 1	Rick Robinson	3	2	1–1	30	27	16	19	1	4	1144.3
Nova Scotia	Laughlin Rutt	1	4	1–0	19	34	15	22	1	5	1154.9
Saskatchewan 2	Pete Andrews	1	4	0–1	29	41	18	20	1	6	1000.2

== Round robin results ==
All draws are listed in Eastern Time (UTC−04:00).

=== Draw 1 ===
Monday, April 28, 3:00 pm

Sheet A	1	2	3	4	5	6	7	8	Final
Nova Scotia (Rutt)	0	0	0	0	0	0	X	X	0
Northern Ontario (Dean) 🔨	4	0	2	3	1	1	X	X	11

Sheet B	1	2	3	4	5	6	7	8	Final
Ontario (Petrie) 🔨	0	1	0	0	0	0	0	X	1
Alberta (Purvis)	1	0	2	1	2	5	1	X	12

Sheet C	1	2	3	4	5	6	7	8	EE	Final
Saskatchewan 2 (Andrews)	0	0	0	2	0	0	0	6	0	8
Newfoundland and Labrador (Thiessen) 🔨	2	1	1	0	3	1	0	0	1	9

Sheet D	1	2	3	4	5	6	7	8	Final
New Brunswick (Fitzgerald) 🔨	0	1	0	0	2	0	2	0	5
Saskatchewan 1 (Dash)	1	0	1	2	0	2	0	1	7

Sheet E	1	2	3	4	5	6	7	8	Final
British Columbia 1 (Robinson)	1	0	0	0	1	0	0	X	2
Quebec 1 (Marquis) 🔨	0	1	0	1	0	1	2	X	5

=== Draw 2 ===
Tuesday, April 29, 10:00 am

Sheet B	1	2	3	4	5	6	7	8	Final
New Brunswick (Fitzgerald) 🔨	1	0	0	1	0	0	0	X	2
Quebec 2 (Hamel)	0	2	1	0	1	1	2	X	7

Sheet C	1	2	3	4	5	6	7	8	Final
British Columbia 2 (Smithies)	0	0	2	0	1	1	0	1	5
Saskatchewan 1 (Dash) 🔨	2	1	0	0	0	0	1	0	4

Sheet D	1	2	3	4	5	6	7	8	Final
Newfoundland and Labrador (Thiessen) 🔨	1	0	1	2	0	1	0	1	6
Nova Scotia (Rutt)	0	1	0	0	1	0	1	0	3

=== Draw 3 ===
Tuesday, April 29, 2:30 pm

Sheet A	1	2	3	4	5	6	7	8	Final
British Columbia 2 (Smithies)	1	0	0	0	0	1	1	3	6
New Brunswick (Fitzgerald) 🔨	0	1	1	1	1	0	0	0	4

Sheet B	1	2	3	4	5	6	7	8	Final
Northern Ontario (Dean)	0	3	0	1	2	0	0	0	6
Saskatchewan 2 (Andrews) 🔨	1	0	1	0	0	1	3	1	7

Sheet C	1	2	3	4	5	6	7	8	Final
Nova Scotia (Rutt)	0	0	2	0	0	1	1	0	4
British Columbia 1 (Robinson) 🔨	2	1	0	2	1	0	0	2	8

Sheet D	1	2	3	4	5	6	7	8	Final
Quebec 2 (Hamel) 🔨	1	0	1	0	1	1	3	2	9
Ontario (Petrie)	0	4	0	1	0	0	0	0	5

=== Draw 4 ===
Tuesday, April 29, 7:00 pm

Sheet A	1	2	3	4	5	6	7	8	Final
Newfoundland and Labrador (Thiessen)	2	2	0	0	0	2	0	0	6
Quebec 1 (Marquis) 🔨	0	0	2	1	1	0	1	3	8

Sheet B	1	2	3	4	5	6	7	8	Final
Saskatchewan 1 (Dash) 🔨	2	0	0	2	0	0	0	0	4
Alberta (Purvis)	0	1	1	0	0	1	1	1	5

Sheet D	1	2	3	4	5	6	7	8	Final
British Columbia 1 (Robinson)	0	3	0	2	2	0	1	X	8
Northern Ontario (Dean) 🔨	1	0	2	0	0	1	0	X	4

=== Draw 5 ===
Thursday, May 1, 10:00 am

Sheet A	1	2	3	4	5	6	7	8	Final
Alberta (Purvis)	0	0	0	2	0	0	1	X	3
Quebec 2 (Hamel) 🔨	2	1	1	0	2	1	0	X	7

Sheet B	1	2	3	4	5	6	7	8	Final
Newfoundland and Labrador (Thiessen) 🔨	1	0	1	2	0	3	1	X	8
British Columbia 1 (Robinson)	0	1	0	0	2	0	0	X	3

Sheet C	1	2	3	4	5	6	7	8	Final
Saskatchewan 2 (Andrews) 🔨	1	0	1	0	1	1	0	X	4
Quebec 1 (Marquis)	0	2	0	5	0	0	2	X	9

Sheet D	1	2	3	4	5	6	7	8	Final
Ontario (Petrie)	0	0	2	0	1	0	1	0	4
British Columbia 2 (Smithies) 🔨	1	3	0	1	0	1	0	1	7

=== Draw 6 ===
Thursday, May 1, 2:30 pm

Sheet C	1	2	3	4	5	6	7	8	EE	Final
Northern Ontario (Dean)	0	2	2	0	0	1	0	2	1	8
Newfoundland and Labrador (Thiessen) 🔨	2	0	0	1	3	0	1	0	0	7

Sheet D	1	2	3	4	5	6	7	8	Final
Alberta (Purvis)	0	2	3	0	2	0	1	X	8
New Brunswick (Fitzgerald) 🔨	4	0	0	0	0	1	0	X	5

Sheet E	1	2	3	4	5	6	7	8	Final
Quebec 2 (Hamel) 🔨	1	0	0	1	0	0	1	X	3
Saskatchewan 1 (Dash)	0	1	3	0	1	2	0	X	7

=== Draw 7 ===
Thursday, May 1, 7:00 pm

Sheet A	1	2	3	4	5	6	7	8	Final
Saskatchewan 1 (Dash)	3	1	0	0	2	1	2	1	10
Ontario (Petrie) 🔨	0	0	4	1	0	0	0	0	5

Sheet B	1	2	3	4	5	6	7	8	Final
British Columbia 2 (Smithies)	0	0	0	3	3	1	0	1	8
Quebec 2 (Hamel) 🔨	4	1	4	0	0	0	1	0	10

Sheet D	1	2	3	4	5	6	7	8	Final
Nova Scotia (Rutt) 🔨	3	1	1	1	0	0	0	2	8
Saskatchewan 2 (Andrews)	0	0	0	0	1	2	1	0	4

Sheet E	1	2	3	4	5	6	7	8	Final
Quebec 1 (Marquis)	0	3	0	0	0	2	0	0	5
Northern Ontario (Dean) 🔨	2	0	4	1	1	0	1	1	10

=== Draw 8 ===
Friday, May 2, 10:00 am

Sheet A	1	2	3	4	5	6	7	8	Final
British Columbia 1 (Robinson) 🔨	3	0	0	4	0	2	0	X	9
Saskatchewan 2 (Andrews)	0	2	2	0	1	0	1	X	6

Sheet B	1	2	3	4	5	6	7	8	Final
Quebec 1 (Marquis)	0	1	0	0	1	0	2	1	5
Nova Scotia (Rutt) 🔨	1	0	1	1	0	1	0	0	4

Sheet C	1	2	3	4	5	6	7	8	Final
Ontario (Petrie)	3	0	1	1	0	1	0	1	7
New Brunswick (Fitzgerald) 🔨	0	1	0	0	2	0	0	0	3

Sheet E	1	2	3	4	5	6	7	8	Final
Alberta (Purvis)	0	1	1	0	1	2	2	X	7
British Columbia 2 (Smithies) 🔨	1	0	0	2	0	0	0	X	3

== Consolation ==
=== Ninth place game ===
Saturday, May 3, 10:00 am

Sheet A	1	2	3	4	5	6	7	8	Final
Nova Scotia (Rutt)	1	0	3	0	0	2	0	2	8
Ontario (Petrie) 🔨	0	1	0	2	1	0	0	0	4

=== Eleventh place game ===
Saturday, May 3, 10:00 am

Sheet E	1	2	3	4	5	6	7	8	Final
Saskatchewan 2 (Andrews) 🔨	0	0	0	0	1	0	X	X	1
New Brunswick (Fitzgerald)	1	3	1	3	0	3	X	X	11

== Playoffs ==
Quarterfinals
1	Quebec 2	4
8	British Columbia 1	7
4	Alberta	8
5	Northern Ontario	9
3	Newfoundland and Labrador	13
6	British Columbia 2	0
2	Quebec 1	6
7	Saskatchewan 1	5

Semifinals
8	British Columbia 1	2
5	Northern Ontario	8
3	Newfoundland and Labrador	2
2	Quebec 1	7

Final
5	Northern Ontario	8
2	Quebec 1	5
Third place
8	British Columbia 1	7
3	Newfoundland and Labrador	5

=== Quarterfinals ===
Friday, May 2, 3:00 pm

Sheet A	1	2	3	4	5	6	7	8	Final
Alberta (Purvis) 🔨	3	1	2	0	0	0	2	0	8
Northern Ontario (Dean)	0	0	0	2	3	2	0	2	9

Sheet B	1	2	3	4	5	6	7	8	Final
Quebec 2 (Hamel) 🔨	2	0	1	0	0	1	0	0	4
British Columbia 1 (Robinson)	0	1	0	2	2	0	1	1	7

Sheet C	1	2	3	4	5	6	7	8	Final
Quebec 1 (Marquis) 🔨	0	1	1	0	2	0	1	1	6
Saskatchewan 1 (Dash)	0	0	0	3	0	2	0	0	5

Sheet D	1	2	3	4	5	6	7	8	Final
Newfoundland and Labrador (Thiessen) 🔨	2	2	2	1	3	3	X	X	13
British Columbia 2 (Smithies)	0	0	0	0	0	0	X	X	0

=== Semifinals ===
Saturday, May 3, 10:00 am

Sheet B	1	2	3	4	5	6	7	8	Final
Newfoundland and Labrador (Thiessen)	0	0	0	0	0	0	2	X	2
Quebec 1 (Marquis) 🔨	1	0	2	1	2	1	0	X	7

Sheet D	1	2	3	4	5	6	7	8	Final
British Columbia 1 (Robinson) 🔨	1	0	0	0	1	0	X	X	2
Northern Ontario (Dean)	0	2	1	2	0	3	X	X	8

=== Bronze medal game ===
Saturday, May 3, 3:00 pm

Sheet B	1	2	3	4	5	6	7	8	Final
British Columbia 1 (Robinson)	2	0	4	0	1	0	0	X	7
Newfoundland and Labrador (Thiessen) 🔨	0	1	0	2	0	1	1	X	5

=== Final ===
Saturday, May 3, 3:00 pm

Sheet C	1	2	3	4	5	6	7	8	Final
Northern Ontario (Dean)	0	2	0	3	0	2	1	0	8
Quebec 1 (Marquis) 🔨	1	0	2	0	1	0	0	1	5

== Final standings ==
Place	Team
1st place, gold medalist(s)	Northern Ontario
2nd place, silver medalist(s)	Quebec 1
3rd place, bronze medalist(s)	British Columbia 1
4	Newfoundland and Labrador
5	Quebec 2
6	Alberta
7	British Columbia 2
8	Saskatchewan 1
9	Nova Scotia
10	Ontario
11	New Brunswick
12	Saskatchewan 2
