= 2011 Canadian Wheelchair Curling Championship =

- Host city: Edmonton, Alberta
- Arena: Jasper Place Curling Club
- Dates: March 21–27
- Winner: Manitoba
- Skip: Chris Sobkowicz
- Third: Dennis Thiessen
- Second: Melissa Lecuyer
- Lead: George Horning
- Finalist: Alberta (Bruno Yizek)

The 2011 Canadian Wheelchair Curling Championship was held March 21–27 at the Jasper Place Curling Club in Edmonton, Alberta.

Manitoba won their first Canadian Wheelchair Curling Championship, defeating Alberta in the final.

== Teams ==
Team	Skip	Third	Second	Lead
(Alberta) Host Team	Cliff Nuspl	Mike McMullan	Warren Fleury	Shawna Walsh
Alberta	Bruno Yizek	Jack Smart	Anne Hibberd	Bridget Wilson
Saskatchewan	Darwin Bender	Gil Dash	Marie Wright	Terry Hart
Newfoundland and Labrador	Joanne MacDonald	Darlene Jackman	Felix Green	Lanie Woodfine
Nova Scotia	Michael Fitzgerald	Laughlin Rutt	Trendal Hubley-Bolivar	Debbie Earle
Quebec	Benoit Lessard	Carl Marquis	Sébastien Boisvert	Johanne Daly
Manitoba	Chris Sobkowicz	Dennis Thiessen	Melissa Lecuyer	George Horning
British Columbia	Gary Cormack	Frank LaBounty	Vince Miele	Allison Duddy
Northern Ontario	Wayne Ficek	Mark Wherrett	Chester Draper	Denise Miault
Ontario	Chris Rees	Carl Bax	Alec Denys	Shauna Petrie

== Standings ==
Final round-robin standings

Key
Teams to Playoffs

Team	W	L
Alberta	8	1
Nova Scotia	8	1
Manitoba	7	2
British Columbia	6	3
Northern Ontario	4	5
(Alberta) Host Team	4	5
Saskatchewan	3	6
Quebec	3	6
Ontario	2	7
Newfoundland and Labrador	0	9

== Playoffs ==
Page playoff system
1	Alberta	6
2	Nova Scotia	5
3	Manitoba	6
4	British Columbia	4

Semifinal
2	Nova Scotia	3
3	Manitoba	6

Final
1	Alberta	7
3	Manitoba	8

=== 1 vs 2 ===
Sheet B	1	2	3	4	5	6	7	8	Final
Alberta (Yizek)	1	0	0	0	2	1	2	0	6
Nova Scotia (Fitzgerald) 🔨	0	2	1	1	0	0	0	1	5

=== 3 vs 4 ===
Sheet B	1	2	3	4	5	6	7	8	Final
British Columbia (Cormack)	0	0	0	1	1	0	2	X	4
Manitoba (Sobkowicz) 🔨	1	1	1	0	0	3	0	X	6

=== Semifinal ===
Sheet B	1	2	3	4	5	6	7	8	Final
Nova Scotia (Fitzgerald) 🔨	1	0	0	0	2	0	0	X	3
Manitoba (Sobkowicz)	0	1	1	0	0	2	2	X	6

=== Final ===
Sheet C	1	2	3	4	5	6	7	8	Final
Alberta (Yizek) 🔨	1	0	3	0	0	2	0	1	7
Manitoba (Sobkowicz)	0	2	0	1	2	0	3	0	8
