= 2024 Canadian Wheelchair Curling Championship =

- Host city: Moose Jaw, Saskatchewan
- Arena: Moose Jaw Ford Curling Centre
- Dates: March 24–30
- Winner: Saskatchewan 1
- Curling club: Moose Jaw Ford CC, Moose Jaw
- Skip: Gil Dash
- Third: Marie Wright
- Second: Moose Gibson
- Lead: Sheryl Pederson
- Coach: Lorraine Arguin
- Finalist: Newfoundland and Labrador (Dean)

The 2024 Canadian Wheelchair Curling Championship was held from March 24 to 30 at the Moose Jaw Ford Curling Centre in Moose Jaw, Saskatchewan. This was the second year in a row the event was held in Moose Jaw.

== Teams ==
The teams are listed as follows:

Province / Territory	Skip	Third	Second	Lead	Alternate	Locale
Alberta 1	Martin Purvis	Terry Fowler	Bruno Yizek	Wendy Frazier		Garrison CC, Calgary
Alberta 2	Don Kuchelyma	Cory Galloway	Emma Nagel	Shane Williams	Marie Laframboise	Avonair CC, Edmonton
British Columbia	Gerry Austgarden	Ina Forrest	Rick Robinson	Glen McDonald		Kelowna/Vernon/Richmond
Manitoba	Dennis Thiessen	Jamie Anseeuw	Jill Hopkins	Mark Wherrett		Assiniboine Memorial CC, Winnipeg
New Brunswick	Michael Fitzgerald	Sarah Benevides	James O'Hara	Elaine Mazerolle		Thistle-St. Andrews CC, Saint John
Newfoundland and Labrador	Doug Dean	Felix Green	Katie Hubbard	Cecilia Carroll		St. John's CC, St. John's
Ontario 1	Doug Morris	Reid Mulligan	Karl Allen	Martha Gustafson		King CC, Schomberg
Ontario 2	Chris Rees	Shauna Petrie	Jeff Harris	Ken Gregory	Dave Krook	Toronto CSP Club, Toronto
Quebec	Carl Marquis	Sébastien Boisvert	Johanne Mathieu	Noemie Gagné		CC Magog, Magog
Saskatchewan 1	Gil Dash	Marie Wright	Moose Gibson	Sheryl Pederson		Moose Jaw Ford CC, Moose Jaw
Saskatchewan 2	Rodney Pederson	Pete Andrews	Mark Kennedy	Zahra Ehsani	Tara Hess	Moose Jaw Ford CC, Moose Jaw

== Round robin standings ==
Final Round Robin Standings

Key
Teams to Playoffs

Team	Skip	W	L	W–L	PF	PA	EW	EL	BE	SE
Saskatchewan 1	Gil Dash	8	2	1–0	80	32	43	27	3	24
Newfoundland and Labrador	Doug Dean	8	2	0–1	75	58	42	35	1	19
British Columbia	Gerry Austgarden	7	3	1–0	71	50	41	33	0	21
Manitoba	Dennis Thiessen	7	3	0–1	68	59	38	34	0	16
Ontario 1	Doug Morris	5	5	–	57	64	35	35	0	19
Ontario 2	Chris Rees	4	6	2–1; 1–0	68	80	39	37	0	18
Alberta 1	Martin Purvis	4	6	2–1; 0–1	54	63	30	42	2	12
Quebec	Carl Marquis	4	6	1–2; 1–0	77	62	42	34	0	17
Alberta 2	Don Kuchelyma	4	6	1–2; 0–1	61	85	38	39	1	20
Saskatchewan 2	Rodney Pederson	3	7	–	56	74	30	43	0	13
New Brunswick	Michael Fitzgerald	1	9	–	45	85	26	45	0	7

== Round robin results ==
All draws are listed in Central Time (UTC−05:00).

=== Draw 1 ===
Sunday, March 24, 3:00 pm

Sheet A	1	2	3	4	5	6	7	8	Final
New Brunswick (Fitzgerald)	1	0	0	0	3	0	2	0	6
Alberta 1 (Purvis)	0	3	1	2	0	3	0	2	11

Sheet B	1	2	3	4	5	6	7	8	Final
Saskatchewan 2 (Pederson)	0	0	0	0	1	0	X	X	1
Saskatchewan 1 (Dash)	3	4	1	1	0	2	X	X	11

Sheet C	1	2	3	4	5	6	7	8	Final
Alberta 2 (Kuchelyma)	0	2	0	0	0	0	0	X	2
Quebec (Marquis)	5	0	2	1	3	1	3	X	15

Sheet D	1	2	3	4	5	6	7	8	Final
British Columbia (Austgarden)	2	1	3	0	1	0	0	0	7
Ontario 2 (Rees)	0	0	0	1	0	1	1	2	5

Sheet E	1	2	3	4	5	6	7	8	Final
Newfoundland and Labrador (Dean)	1	1	1	3	6	0	0	X	12
Ontario 1 (Morris)	0	0	0	0	0	2	2	X	4

=== Draw 2 ===
Monday, March 25, 1:30 pm

Sheet A	1	2	3	4	5	6	7	8	Final
Manitoba (Thiessen)	2	4	4	2	0	1	2	X	15
Alberta 2 (Kuchelyma)	0	0	0	0	1	0	0	X	1

Sheet B	1	2	3	4	5	6	7	8	EE	Final
Newfoundland and Labrador (Dean)	1	0	0	1	0	1	2	0	1	6
Alberta 1 (Purvis)	0	1	0	0	1	0	0	3	0	5

Sheet C	1	2	3	4	5	6	7	8	Final
Ontario 2 (Rees)	6	1	0	1	2	1	0	X	11
New Brunswick (Fitzgerald)	0	0	7	0	0	0	2	X	9

Sheet D	1	2	3	4	5	6	7	8	Final
Quebec (Marquis)	0	3	0	2	3	2	3	X	13
Ontario 1 (Morris)	2	0	4	0	0	0	0	X	6

Sheet E	1	2	3	4	5	6	7	8	Final
British Columbia (Austgarden)	2	0	1	1	0	2	4	X	10
Saskatchewan 2 (Pederson)	0	2	0	0	2	0	0	X	4

=== Draw 3 ===
Monday, March 25, 7:00 pm

Sheet A	1	2	3	4	5	6	7	8	Final
Saskatchewan 1 (Dash)	0	0	5	3	1	0	3	X	12
Ontario 2 (Rees)	1	1	0	0	0	1	0	X	3

Sheet B	1	2	3	4	5	6	7	8	Final
New Brunswick (Fitzgerald)	0	0	0	0	0	1	X	X	1
British Columbia (Austgarden)	1	5	1	1	3	0	X	X	11

Sheet C	1	2	3	4	5	6	7	8	Final
Manitoba (Thiessen)	0	0	0	0	1	0	X	X	1
Saskatchewan 2 (Pederson)	3	3	5	2	0	1	X	X	14

Sheet D	1	2	3	4	5	6	7	8	Final
Newfoundland and Labrador (Dean)	0	3	3	0	0	1	0	1	8
Alberta 2 (Kuchelyma)	1	0	0	1	2	0	2	0	6

Sheet E	1	2	3	4	5	6	7	8	Final
Alberta 1 (Purvis)	4	0	0	0	3	1	1	X	9
Quebec (Marquis)	0	3	2	1	0	0	0	X	6

=== Draw 4 ===
Tuesday, March 26, 1:30 pm

Sheet A	1	2	3	4	5	6	7	8	Final
British Columbia (Austgarden)	0	2	0	0	0	1	1	0	4
Newfoundland and Labrador (Dean)	2	0	1	1	1	0	0	1	6

Sheet B	1	2	3	4	5	6	7	8	Final
Ontario 2 (Rees)	0	1	0	2	2	0	1	0	6
Quebec (Marquis)	2	0	1	0	0	1	0	1	5

Sheet C	1	2	3	4	5	6	7	8	Final
Ontario 1 (Morris)	0	0	1	0	0	1	2	X	4
Saskatchewan 1 (Dash)	4	1	0	0	1	0	0	X	6

Sheet D	1	2	3	4	5	6	7	8	Final
Saskatchewan 2 (Pederson)	0	1	1	1	0	1	0	0	4
Alberta 1 (Purvis)	0	0	0	0	1	0	0	2	3

Sheet E	1	2	3	4	5	6	7	8	Final
New Brunswick (Fitzgerald)	0	1	0	1	1	0	0	X	3
Manitoba (Thiessen)	1	0	4	0	0	2	1	X	8

=== Draw 5 ===
Tuesday, March 26, 6:30 pm

Sheet A	1	2	3	4	5	6	7	8	Final
Saskatchewan 2 (Pederson)	1	0	0	1	0	4	0	0	6
Quebec (Marquis)	0	1	1	0	2	0	3	1	8

Sheet B	1	2	3	4	5	6	7	8	Final
Manitoba (Thiessen)	1	0	3	0	0	0	0	X	4
Ontario 1 (Morris)	0	1	0	2	1	4	1	X	9

Sheet C	1	2	3	4	5	6	7	8	Final
British Columbia (Austgarden)	1	0	2	2	1	1	1	X	8
Alberta 1 (Purvis)	0	1	0	0	0	0	0	X	1

Sheet D	1	2	3	4	5	6	7	8	Final
Saskatchewan 1 (Dash)	1	1	1	0	0	4	2	X	9
New Brunswick (Fitzgerald)	0	0	0	1	1	0	0	X	2

Sheet E	1	2	3	4	5	6	7	8	EE	Final
Ontario 2 (Rees)	0	1	3	0	2	0	2	0	0	8
Alberta 2 (Kuchelyma)	5	0	0	1	0	1	0	1	1	9

=== Draw 6 ===
Wednesday, March 27, 1:30 pm

Sheet A	1	2	3	4	5	6	7	8	Final
Alberta 1 (Purvis)	0	0	0	0	0	0	X	X	0
Ontario 1 (Morris)	1	2	2	1	1	1	X	X	8

Sheet B	1	2	3	4	5	6	7	8	Final
Alberta 2 (Kuchelyma)	0	1	2	1	0	2	1	3	10
Saskatchewan 2 (Pederson)	1	0	0	0	4	0	0	0	5

Sheet C	1	2	3	4	5	6	7	8	Final
Newfoundland and Labrador (Dean)	1	0	1	0	0	0	4	3	9
Ontario 2 (Rees)	0	2	0	1	1	2	0	0	6

Sheet D	1	2	3	4	5	6	7	8	Final
Manitoba (Thiessen)	1	1	0	2	0	2	0	2	8
Quebec (Marquis)	0	0	2	0	1	0	2	0	5

Sheet E	1	2	3	4	5	6	7	8	Final
Saskatchewan 1 (Dash)	1	1	2	3	0	1	3	X	11
British Columbia (Austgarden)	0	0	0	0	1	0	0	X	1

=== Draw 7 ===
Wednesday, March 27, 6:30 pm

Sheet A	1	2	3	4	5	6	7	8	Final
Alberta 2 (Kuchelyma)	1	0	2	4	0	1	0	1	9
New Brunswick (Fitzgerald)	0	1	0	0	3	0	3	0	7

Sheet B	1	2	3	4	5	6	7	8	Final
Alberta 1 (Purvis)	0	0	4	0	0	0	2	X	6
Ontario 2 (Rees)	2	3	0	3	1	1	0	X	10

Sheet C	1	2	3	4	5	6	7	8	EE	Final
Saskatchewan 1 (Dash)	0	0	3	1	1	0	0	0	0	5
Manitoba (Thiessen)	1	0	0	0	0	1	0	3	2	7

Sheet D	1	2	3	4	5	6	7	8	EE	Final
Ontario 1 (Morris)	1	0	0	0	1	1	0	2	1	6
Saskatchewan 2 (Pederson)	0	1	1	2	0	0	1	0	0	5

Sheet E	1	2	3	4	5	6	7	8	Final
Quebec (Marquis)	0	0	3	1	0	2	0	1	7
Newfoundland and Labrador (Dean)	1	1	0	0	3	0	3	0	8

=== Draw 8 ===
Thursday, March 28, 1:30 pm

Sheet A	1	2	3	4	5	6	7	8	Final
Saskatchewan 2 (Pederson)	2	1	1	0	0	3	2	0	9
Ontario 2 (Rees)	0	0	0	4	2	0	0	2	8

Sheet B	1	2	3	4	5	6	7	8	Final
Saskatchewan 1 (Dash)	2	1	0	2	1	0	3	X	9
Newfoundland and Labrador (Dean)	0	0	1	0	0	1	0	X	2

Sheet C	1	2	3	4	5	6	7	8	Final
New Brunswick (Fitzgerald)	2	0	0	1	0	0	0	X	3
Ontario 1 (Morris)	0	1	2	0	1	2	1	X	7

Sheet D	1	2	3	4	5	6	7	8	EE	Final
Alberta 2 (Kuchelyma)	0	1	2	1	1	0	0	2	0	7
British Columbia (Austgarden)	4	0	0	0	0	1	2	0	1	8

Sheet E	1	2	3	4	5	6	7	8	Final
Manitoba (Thiessen)	0	1	1	0	0	0	2	1	5
Alberta 1 (Purvis)	1	0	0	1	1	1	0	0	4

=== Draw 9 ===
Thursday, March 28, 6:30 pm

Sheet A	1	2	3	4	5	6	7	8	Final
Ontario 1 (Morris)	0	0	4	1	1	3	0	X	9
British Columbia (Austgarden)	1	1	0	0	0	0	3	X	5

Sheet B	1	2	3	4	5	6	7	8	Final
Quebec (Marquis)	2	0	3	2	0	2	1	X	10
New Brunswick (Fitzgerald)	0	3	0	0	1	0	0	X	4

Sheet C	1	2	3	4	5	6	7	8	Final
Saskatchewan 2 (Pederson)	2	0	0	0	1	0	4	0	7
Newfoundland and Labrador (Dean)	0	4	2	1	0	1	0	2	10

Sheet D	1	2	3	4	5	6	7	8	Final
Ontario 2 (Rees)	2	0	0	0	1	0	0	X	3
Manitoba (Thiessen)	0	1	2	2	0	4	2	X	11

Sheet E	1	2	3	4	5	6	7	8	Final
Alberta 2 (Kuchelyma)	0	0	1	2	0	0	0	0	3
Saskatchewan 1 (Dash)	1	0	0	0	1	3	2	1	8

=== Draw 10 ===
Friday, March 29, 10:00 am

Sheet A	1	2	3	4	5	6	7	8	Final
Newfoundland and Labrador (Dean)	0	2	0	0	0	1	3	0	6
Manitoba (Thiessen)	1	0	2	1	1	0	0	2	7

Sheet B	1	2	3	4	5	6	7	8	Final
Ontario 1 (Morris)	0	0	0	0	1	0	0	X	1
Alberta 2 (Kuchelyma)	3	1	1	1	0	1	1	X	8

Sheet C	1	2	3	4	5	6	7	8	Final
Quebec (Marquis)	1	0	0	0	2	0	1	0	4
British Columbia (Austgarden)	0	2	1	2	0	2	0	1	8

Sheet D	1	2	3	4	5	6	7	8	Final
Alberta 1 (Purvis)	1	0	1	0	1	1	1	0	5
Saskatchewan 1 (Dash)	0	2	0	1	0	0	0	1	4

Sheet E	1	2	3	4	5	6	7	8	Final
Saskatchewan 2 (Pederson)	0	0	0	0	0	1	0	X	1
New Brunswick (Fitzgerald)	1	1	1	2	1	0	1	X	7

=== Draw 11 ===
Friday, March 29, 3:00 pm

Sheet A	1	2	3	4	5	6	7	8	Final
Quebec (Marquis)	0	1	1	0	1	0	0	1	4
Saskatchewan 1 (Dash)	2	0	0	1	0	1	1	0	5

Sheet B	1	2	3	4	5	6	7	8	Final
British Columbia (Austgarden)	2	2	2	0	1	0	2	X	9
Manitoba (Thiessen)	0	0	0	1	0	1	0	X	2

Sheet C	1	2	3	4	5	6	7	8	Final
Alberta 1 (Purvis)	0	2	0	2	1	5	0	X	10
Alberta 2 (Kuchelyma)	3	0	1	0	0	0	2	X	6

Sheet D	1	2	3	4	5	6	7	8	Final
New Brunswick (Fitzgerald)	0	1	0	0	0	2	0	X	3
Newfoundland and Labrador (Dean)	2	0	2	2	1	0	1	X	8

Sheet E	1	2	3	4	5	6	7	8	Final
Ontario 1 (Morris)	0	0	0	1	0	2	0	X	3
Ontario 2 (Rees)	2	1	2	0	1	0	2	X	8

== Playoffs ==
Semifinal			Final
			1	Saskatchewan 1	7
2	Newfoundland and Labrador	8	2	Newfoundland and Labrador	6
3	British Columbia	4

=== Semifinal ===
Saturday, March 30, 10:00 am

Sheet E	1	2	3	4	5	6	7	8	Final
Newfoundland and Labrador (Dean)	1	0	0	1	0	0	5	1	8
British Columbia (Austgarden)	0	1	1	0	1	1	0	0	4

=== Final ===
Saturday, March 30, 2:30 pm

Sheet E	1	2	3	4	5	6	7	8	EE	Final
Saskatchewan 1 (Dash)	1	1	0	2	1	0	1	0	1	7
Newfoundland and Labrador (Dean)	0	0	1	0	0	2	0	3	0	6

== Final standings ==
Place	Team
1st place, gold medalist(s)	Saskatchewan 1
2nd place, silver medalist(s)	Newfoundland and Labrador
3rd place, bronze medalist(s)	British Columbia
4	Manitoba
5	Ontario 1
6	Ontario 2
7	Alberta 1
8	Quebec
9	Alberta 2
10	Saskatchewan 2
11	New Brunswick
