= 2026 Canadian Wheelchair Curling Championship =

- Host city: Boucherville, Quebec
- Arena: Club de curling Boucherville
- Dates: April 27 – May 2
- Winner: Quebec 1
- Curling club: CC Magog, Magog
- Skip: Carl Marquis
- Third: Sébastien Boisvert
- Second: François Lacourse
- Lead: Johanne Mathieu
- Alternate: Noemie Gagné
- Finalist: Northern Ontario (Dean)

The 2026 Canadian Wheelchair Curling Championship was held from April 27 to May 2 at the Club de curling Boucherville in Boucherville, Quebec. This was the sixth time Boucherville hosted the Canadian wheelchair championship.

== Teams ==
The teams are listed as follows:

Province / Territory	Skip	Third	Second	Lead	Alternate	Locale
Alberta	Martin Purvis	Terry Fowler	Wendy Frazier	Kendra Ohama	Stephen Hoffort	Garrison CC, Calgary
British Columbia 1	Marney Smithies	Kevin Priebe	Robert Pullen	Kim Egger		Kelowna CC, Kelowna; Delta Thistle CC, Delta
British Columbia 2	Chris Daw	Frank La Bounty	Tom Henderson	Elizabeth Daw	Matthew Ford	Esquimalt CC, Esquimalt; Duncan CC, Duncan
Manitoba	Billy Bridges	Claude Brunet	Carolyn Linder	Jennifer Kowalson		Heather CC, Winnipeg
New Brunswick	Sarah Benevides	Michael Fitzgerald	Elaine Mazerolle	James O'Hara		Thistle St. Andrews CC, Saint John
Newfoundland and Labrador	Cecilia Carroll	Felix Green	Katie Hubbard	Christine Lavallee		St. John's CC, St. John's
Northern Ontario	Douglas Dean	Gino Sonego	Rick Bell	Aimee Epp	Lola Graham	Fort William CC, Thunder Bay
Nova Scotia	Laughlin Rutt	Stephen Parfitt	Marieann MacEachren	Harris Josey	Joseph Dulong	Lakeshore CC, Lower Sackville
Ontario	Karl Allen	Chrissy Molnar	Reid Mulligan	Jill Hopkins		King CC, Schomberg
Quebec 1	Carl Marquis	Sébastien Boisvert	François Lacourse	Johanne Mathieu	Noemie Gagné	CC Magog, Magog
Quebec 2	Luc Hamel	Mario Trudel	Martin Larose	Monique Martel	Annik Charron	CC Victoria, Sainte-Foy
Saskatchewan	Marie Wright	Gil Dash	Moose Gibson	Pete Andrews		Moose Jaw Ford CC, Moose Jaw

== Round Robin Standings ==
Final Round Robin Standings

Key
Teams to Playoffs

Pool A	Skip	W	L	W–L	PF	PA	EW	EL	BE	SE	LSD
Saskatchewan	Marie Wright	5	0	–	37	19	20	14	0	6	95.85
Northern Ontario	Douglas Dean	4	1	–	47	15	25	10	2	18	91.13
Newfoundland and Labrador	Cecilia Carroll	3	2	–	37	32	20	18	0	11	98.92
Quebec 2	Luc Hamel	2	3	–	26	35	17	21	0	5	100.58
New Brunswick	Sarah Benevides	1	4	–	19	40	14	20	0	6	83.43
Nova Scotia	Laughlin Rutt	0	5	–	15	40	10	24	1	4	128.35

Pool B	Skip	W	L	W–L	PF	PA	EW	EL	BE	SE	LSD
Quebec 1	Carl Marquis	5	0	–	46	17	23	13	0	11	128.20
Ontario	Karl Allen	4	1	–	40	24	22	14	0	10	116.24
British Columbia 1	Marney Smithies	2	3	1–0	22	35	18	17	0	6	121.88
Alberta	Martin Purvis	2	3	0–1	25	30	18	16	2	5	100.60
British Columbia 2	Chris Daw	1	4	1–0	25	34	16	21	0	6	140.37
Manitoba	Billy Bridges	1	4	0–1	25	44	10	26	1	1	136.88

== Round Robin Results ==
All draws are listed in Eastern Time (UTC−04:00).

=== Draw 1 ===
Monday, April 27, 4:00 pm

Sheet A	1	2	3	4	5	6	7	8	Final
Manitoba (Bridges)	0	0	4	0	0	1	0	0	5
Ontario (Allen) 🔨	5	1	0	2	1	0	1	0	10

Sheet B	1	2	3	4	5	6	7	8	Final
Newfoundland and Labrador (Carroll)	0	2	1	0	0	0	2	2	7
Quebec 2 (Hamel) 🔨	2	0	0	1	2	1	0	0	6

Sheet C	1	2	3	4	5	6	7	8	Final
British Columbia 2 (Daw) 🔨	0	0	0	3	0	1	1	0	5
Quebec 1 (Marquis)	1	3	3	0	1	0	0	3	11

Sheet D	1	2	3	4	5	6	7	8	Final
Saskatchewan (Wright)	0	0	0	2	2	0	1	0	5
Northern Ontario (Dean) 🔨	0	2	1	0	0	0	0	1	4

Sheet E	1	2	3	4	5	6	7	8	Final
British Columbia 1 (Smithies) 🔨	1	0	0	2	0	2	2	X	7
Alberta (Purvis)	0	1	1	0	1	0	0	X	3

=== Draw 2 ===
Tuesday, April 28, 10:00 am

Sheet B	1	2	3	4	5	6	7	8	Final
Saskatchewan (Wright)	0	1	0	0	2	2	0	1	6
New Brunswick (Benevides) 🔨	1	0	1	1	0	0	2	0	5

Sheet C	1	2	3	4	5	6	7	8	Final
Nova Scotia (Rutt)	0	0	0	0	0	0	X	X	0
Northern Ontario (Dean) 🔨	1	2	1	4	2	1	X	X	11

Sheet D	1	2	3	4	5	6	7	8	Final
Quebec 1 (Marquis) 🔨	1	4	1	2	1	0	3	X	12
Manitoba (Bridges)	0	0	0	0	0	1	0	X	1

=== Draw 3 ===
Tuesday, April 28, 2:30 pm

Sheet A	1	2	3	4	5	6	7	8	Final
Nova Scotia (Rutt)	0	2	0	0	0	1	2	X	5
Saskatchewan (Wright) 🔨	3	0	2	0	3	0	0	X	8

Sheet B	1	2	3	4	5	6	7	8	Final
Ontario (Allen) 🔨	0	2	2	1	1	0	1	X	7
British Columbia 2 (Daw)	1	0	0	0	0	2	0	X	3

Sheet C	1	2	3	4	5	6	7	8	Final
Manitoba (Bridges) 🔨	0	0	5	0	5	0	X	X	10
British Columbia 1 (Smithies)	1	1	0	1	0	1	X	X	4

Sheet D	1	2	3	4	5	6	7	8	Final
New Brunswick (Benevides)	0	0	0	0	1	0	X	X	1
Newfoundland and Labrador (Carroll) 🔨	2	5	2	2	0	3	X	X	14

=== Draw 4 ===
Tuesday, April 28, 7:00 pm

Sheet A	1	2	3	4	5	6	7	8	Final
Quebec 1 (Marquis) 🔨	0	2	0	1	0	1	2	X	6
Alberta (Purvis)	1	0	1	0	0	0	0	X	2

Sheet B	1	2	3	4	5	6	7	8	Final
Northern Ontario (Dean) 🔨	2	3	1	0	1	3	0	X	10
Quebec 2 (Hamel)	0	0	0	2	0	0	1	X	3

Sheet D	1	2	3	4	5	6	7	8	Final
British Columbia 1 (Smithies)	0	0	0	1	1	0	0	X	2
Ontario (Allen) 🔨	2	1	1	0	0	2	2	X	8

=== Draw 5 ===
Wednesday, April 29, 10:00 am

Sheet A	1	2	3	4	5	6	7	8	Final
British Columbia 1 (Smithies) 🔨	1	0	2	1	0	0	1	1	6
British Columbia 2 (Daw)	0	3	0	0	1	1	0	0	5

Sheet B	1	2	3	4	5	6	7	8	Final
Alberta (Purvis) 🔨	1	0	2	1	1	2	0	2	9
Manitoba (Bridges)	0	3	0	0	0	0	2	0	5

Sheet C	1	2	3	4	5	6	7	8	Final
Newfoundland and Labrador (Carroll)	0	1	0	0	0	1	0	X	2
Saskatchewan (Wright) 🔨	1	0	4	1	1	0	4	X	11

Sheet E	1	2	3	4	5	6	7	8	Final
Quebec 2 (Hamel) 🔨	0	0	2	0	2	1	1	1	7
Nova Scotia (Rutt)	1	1	0	3	0	0	0	0	5

=== Draw 6 ===
Wednesday, April 29, 2:30 pm

Sheet C	1	2	3	4	5	6	7	8	Final
Quebec 1 (Marquis) 🔨	3	2	1	0	0	0	2	0	8
Ontario (Allen)	0	0	0	1	1	3	0	1	6

Sheet D	1	2	3	4	5	6	7	8	Final
Quebec 2 (Hamel)	0	1	0	0	0	2	0	X	3
Saskatchewan (Wright) 🔨	2	0	1	1	1	0	2	X	7

Sheet E	1	2	3	4	5	6	7	8	Final
Northern Ontario (Dean)	2	2	3	1	2	2	X	X	12
New Brunswick (Benevides) 🔨	0	0	0	0	0	0	X	X	0

=== Draw 7 ===
Wednesday, April 29, 7:00 pm

Sheet A	1	2	3	4	5	6	7	8	EE	Final
Northern Ontario (Dean) 🔨	0	0	2	1	0	0	1	3	3	10
Newfoundland and Labrador (Carroll)	3	2	0	0	1	1	0	0	0	7

Sheet B	1	2	3	4	5	6	7	8	Final
Nova Scotia (Rutt)	0	0	0	0	0	1	X	X	1
New Brunswick (Benevides) 🔨	1	2	1	2	1	0	X	X	7

Sheet D	1	2	3	4	5	6	7	8	Final
Manitoba (Bridges) 🔨	2	0	0	0	1	1	0	0	4
British Columbia 2 (Daw)	0	4	2	1	0	0	1	1	9

Sheet E	1	2	3	4	5	6	7	8	Final
Alberta (Purvis)	0	1	0	1	0	2	2	X	6
Ontario (Allen) 🔨	4	0	2	0	3	0	0	X	9

=== Draw 8 ===
Thursday, April 30, 10:00 am

Sheet A	1	2	3	4	5	6	7	8	Final
Quebec 2 (Hamel) 🔨	1	0	1	0	2	0	0	3	7
New Brunswick (Benevides)	0	3	0	1	0	1	1	0	6

Sheet B	1	2	3	4	5	6	7	8	Final
Quebec 1 (Marquis) 🔨	4	0	2	0	0	2	1	X	9
British Columbia 1 (Smithies)	0	1	0	1	1	0	0	X	3

Sheet C	1	2	3	4	5	6	7	8	Final
British Columbia 2 (Daw)	0	1	1	0	0	1	0	X	3
Alberta (Purvis) 🔨	3	0	0	0	1	0	1	X	5

Sheet D	1	2	3	4	5	6	7	8	Final
Newfoundland and Labrador (Carroll) 🔨	1	2	1	1	0	0	0	2	7
Nova Scotia (Rutt)	0	0	0	0	2	1	1	0	4

== Consolation ==
Consolation Quarterfinals
A5	New Brunswick	2
B6	Manitoba	8
B5	British Columbia 2	2
A6	Nova Scotia	7

7–10th place Semifinals
B4	Alberta	10
B6	Manitoba	1
A4	Quebec 2	4
A6	Nova Scotia	11

7th place game
B4	Alberta	10
A6	Nova Scotia	6
9th place game
B6	Manitoba	2
A4	Quebec 2	11

11th place game
A5	New Brunswick	7
B5	British Columbia 2	13

=== Consolation Quarterfinals ===
Thursday, April 30, 3:00 pm

Sheet A	1	2	3	4	5	6	7	8	Final
New Brunswick (Benevides) 🔨	1	1	0	0	0	0	X	X	2
Manitoba (Bridges)	0	0	2	2	2	2	X	X	8

Sheet C	1	2	3	4	5	6	7	8	Final
British Columbia 2 (Daw)	0	0	0	0	2	0	0	X	2
Nova Scotia (Rutt) 🔨	1	1	1	1	0	1	2	X	7

=== 7–10th place Semifinals ===
Friday, May 1, 10:00 am

Sheet B	1	2	3	4	5	6	7	8	Final
Alberta (Purvis) 🔨	2	1	0	2	2	3	X	X	10
Manitoba (Bridges)	0	0	1	0	0	0	X	X	1

Sheet D	1	2	3	4	5	6	7	8	Final
Quebec 2 (Hamel) 🔨	2	0	0	0	0	2	0	X	4
Nova Scotia (Rutt)	0	1	2	4	1	0	3	X	11

=== 11th place game ===
Friday, May 1, 10:00 am

Sheet E	1	2	3	4	5	6	7	8	Final
New Brunswick (Benevides) 🔨	0	4	0	3	0	0	0	X	7
British Columbia 2 (Daw)	1	0	1	0	4	4	3	X	13

=== 9th place game ===
Friday, May 1, 3:00 pm

Sheet A	1	2	3	4	5	6	7	8	Final
Manitoba (Bridges) 🔨	0	0	1	0	1	0	X	X	2
Quebec 2 (Hamel)	1	2	0	2	0	6	X	X	11

=== 7th place game ===
Saturday, May 2, 10:00 am

Sheet D	1	2	3	4	5	6	7	8	Final
Alberta (Purvis) 🔨	0	0	3	1	2	0	4	X	10
Nova Scotia (Rutt)	3	1	0	0	0	2	0	X	6

== Championship Round ==
Page 1/2 Qualifier
A1 vs. B2
A1	Saskatchewan	5
B2	Ontario	4

Page 3/4 Qualifier
B2 vs. A3
B2	Ontario	9
A3	Newfoundland and Labrador	1

Qualified for Playoffs
Saskatchewan	To 1 vs. 2 Page
Ontario	To 3 vs. 4 Page

Page 1/2 Qualifier
B1 vs. A2
B1	Quebec 1	9
A2	Northern Ontario	2

Page 3/4 Qualifier
A2 vs. B3
A2	Northern Ontario	6
B3	British Columbia 1	4

Qualified for Playoffs
Quebec 1	To 1 vs. 2 Page
Northern Ontario	To 3 vs. 4 Page

5th Place Game
A3	Newfoundland and Labrador	10
B3	British Columbia 1	4

=== Page 1/2 Qualifier ===
Thursday, April 30, 3:00 pm

Sheet B	1	2	3	4	5	6	7	8	Final
Saskatchewan (Wright) 🔨	1	0	0	0	1	0	2	1	5
Ontario (Allen)	0	1	1	1	0	1	0	0	4

Sheet D	1	2	3	4	5	6	7	8	Final
Quebec 1 (Marquis) 🔨	2	1	0	0	3	1	2	X	9
Northern Ontario (Dean)	0	0	2	0	0	0	0	X	2

=== Page 3/4 Qualifier ===
Friday, May 1, 10:00 am

Sheet A	1	2	3	4	5	6	7	8	Final
Ontario (Allen)	2	2	2	0	2	1	X	X	9
Newfoundland and Labrador (Carroll) 🔨	0	0	0	1	0	0	X	X	1

Sheet C	1	2	3	4	5	6	7	8	Final
Northern Ontario (Dean)	0	3	1	0	0	1	0	1	6
British Columbia 1 (Smithies) 🔨	1	0	0	1	1	0	1	0	4

=== 5th place game ===
Friday, May 1, 3:00 pm

Sheet E	1	2	3	4	5	6	7	8	Final
Newfoundland and Labrador (Carroll) 🔨	2	0	3	0	1	1	3	X	10
British Columbia 1 (Smithies)	0	3	0	1	0	0	0	X	4

== Playoffs ==
Page playoff system
1	Saskatchewan	2
2	Quebec 1	5
3	Ontario	6
4	Northern Ontario	8

Semifinal
1	Saskatchewan	6
4	Northern Ontario	8

Final
2	Quebec 1	10
4	Northern Ontario	6

=== 1 vs. 2 ===
Friday, May 1, 3:00 pm

Sheet C	1	2	3	4	5	6	7	8	Final
Saskatchewan (Wright)	0	0	1	0	0	0	1	X	2
Quebec 1 (Marquis) 🔨	1	0	0	2	1	1	0	X	5

=== 3 vs. 4 ===
Friday, May 1, 3:00 pm

Sheet B	1	2	3	4	5	6	7	8	EE	Final
Ontario (Allen)	1	2	0	1	0	2	0	0	0	6
Northern Ontario (Dean) 🔨	0	0	1	0	1	0	1	3	2	8

=== Semifinal ===
Saturday, May 2, 10:00 am

Sheet A	1	2	3	4	5	6	7	8	EE	Final
Saskatchewan (Wright) 🔨	0	2	0	0	1	0	3	0	0	6
Northern Ontario (Dean)	1	0	1	0	0	3	0	1	2	8

=== Final ===
Saturday, May 2, 2:00 pm

Sheet C	1	2	3	4	5	6	7	8	Final
Quebec 1 (Marquis)	0	5	0	0	5	0	X	X	10
Northern Ontario (Dean) 🔨	0	0	4	1	0	1	X	X	6

== Final standings ==
Place	Team
1st place, gold medalist(s)	Quebec 1
2nd place, silver medalist(s)	Northern Ontario
3rd place, bronze medalist(s)	Saskatchewan
4	Ontario
5	Newfoundland and Labrador
6	British Columbia 1
7	Alberta
8	Nova Scotia
9	Quebec 2
10	Manitoba
11	British Columbia 2
12	New Brunswick
