= 2013 Canadian Wheelchair Curling Championship =

- Host city: Ottawa, Ontario
- Arena: RA Centre
- Dates: March 24–31
- Winner: Quebec
- Curling club: Magog Curling Club, Magog
- Skip: Benoit Lessard
- Third: Carl Marquis
- Second: Sébastien Boisvert
- Lead: Johanne Daly
- Finalist: British Columbia (Gary Cormack)

The 2013 Canadian Wheelchair Curling Championship was held from March 24 to 31 at the RA Centre in Ottawa, Ontario. Quebec, skipped by Benoit Lessard, won their first Canadian wheelchair title by defeating British Columbia, skipped by Paralympian Gary Cormack.

== Teams ==
The teams are listed as follows:

Province	Skip	Third	Second	Lead	Alternate	Locale
Alberta	Bruno Yizek	Jack Smart	Martin Purvis	Anne Hibberd	Wendy Frazier	Calgary Curling Club, Calgary
British Columbia	Gary Cormack	Frank LaBounty	Vince Miele	Alison Duddy	Samantha Siu	Kelowna Curling Club, Kelowna
Manitoba	Chris Sobkowicz	Dennis Thiessen	Mark Wherrett	Melissa Lecuyer	Doris Peloquin	Assiniboine Memorial Curling Club, Winnipeg
New Brunswick	Michael Fitzgerald	Jonathan Alexander	Jon Polley	Kayla Todd		Thistle St. Andrews Curling Club, Saint John
Newfoundland and Labrador	Joanne MacDonald	Darlene Jackman	Felix Green	Cecilia Carroll		RE/MAX Curling Club, St. John's
Northern Ontario	Gino Sonego	Doug Dean	Richard Dawid	Lola Graham		Fort William Curling Club, Fort William
Nova Scotia	Trendal Hubley-Bolivar	Devin Forbes	Keith Williams	Debbie Earle	Terry Cousineau	Lakeshore Curling Club, Lower Sackville
Ontario	Ken Gregory	Collinda Joseph	Jon Thurston	Chrissy Molnar		Bradford & District Curling Club, Bradford
Quebec	Benoit Lessard	Carl Marquis	Sébastien Boisvert	Johanne Daly		Magog Curling Club, Magog
Saskatchewan	Darwin Bender	Gil Dash	Marie Wright	Larry Schrader		Callie Curling Club, Regina

== Round-robin standings ==
Final round-robin standings

Key
Teams to Playoffs

Province	Skip	W	L
Quebec	Benoit Lessard	8	1
British Columbia	Gary Cormack	7	2
Alberta	Bruno Yizek	6	3
Northern Ontario	Gino Sonego	5	4
Manitoba	Chris Sobkowicz	4	5
Newfoundland and Labrador	Joanne MacDonald	4	5
Ontario	Ken Gregory	3	6
Nova Scotia	Trendal Hubley-Bolivar	3	6
Saskatchewan	Darwin Bender	3	6
New Brunswick	Michael Fitzgerald	2	7

== Round-robin results ==
All draw times are listed in Eastern Daylight Time (UTC−4).

=== Draw 1 ===
Monday, March 25, 10:00 am

Sheet A	1	2	3	4	5	6	7	8	Final
Newfoundland and Labrador (MacDonald) 🔨	2	1	0	1	2	0	1	1	8
Alberta (Yizek)	0	0	6	0	0	1	0	0	7

Sheet B	1	2	3	4	5	6	7	8	Final
Quebec (Lessard)	1	1	0	1	1	2	1	0	7
Nova Scotia (Hubley-Bolivar) 🔨	0	0	1	0	0	0	0	2	3

Sheet C	1	2	3	4	5	6	7	8	Final
New Brunswick (Fitzgerald)	0	0	0	1	0	0	1	X	2
Ontario (Gregory) 🔨	1	1	5	0	2	2	0	X	11

Sheet D	1	2	3	4	5	6	7	8	Final
Manitoba (Sobkowicz) 🔨	1	1	1	0	0	0	1	0	4
Northern Ontario (Sonego)	0	0	0	1	3	1	0	1	6

Sheet E	1	2	3	4	5	6	7	8	Final
Saskatchewan (Bender)	1	3	0	2	1	1	0	2	10
British Columbia (Cormack) 🔨	0	0	1	0	0	0	5	0	6

=== Draw 2 ===
Monday, March 25, 3:00 pm

Sheet A	1	2	3	4	5	6	7	8	EE	Final
Manitoba (Sobkowicz) 🔨	0	0	2	0	0	2	0	1	0	5
Quebec (Lessard)	0	0	0	1	1	0	3	0	1	6

Sheet B	1	2	3	4	5	6	7	8	Final
Newfoundland and Labrador (MacDonald)	3	0	1	1	0	0	2	1	8
Ontario (Gregory) 🔨	0	2	0	0	1	1	0	0	4

Sheet C	1	2	3	4	5	6	7	8	Final
Alberta (Yizek)	1	0	0	1	1	0	2	4	9
Saskatchewan (Bender) 🔨	0	2	2	0	0	2	0	0	6

Sheet D	1	2	3	4	5	6	7	8	Final
New Brunswick (Fitzgerald) 🔨	2	0	0	0	0	3	0	X	5
British Columbia (Cormack)	0	2	1	3	1	0	2	X	9

Sheet E	1	2	3	4	5	6	7	8	Final
Northern Ontario (Sonego) 🔨	1	5	0	0	1	0	2	X	10
Nova Scotia (Hubley-Bolivar)	0	0	1	2	0	1	0	X	4

=== Draw 3 ===
Tuesday, March 26, 10:00 am

Sheet A	1	2	3	4	5	6	7	8	EE	Final
Nova Scotia (Hubley-Bolivar) 🔨	0	0	0	4	0	0	1	1	0	6
New Brunswick (Fitzgerald)	1	1	2	0	1	1	0	0	1	7

Sheet B	1	2	3	4	5	6	7	8	Final
Saskatchewan (Bender)	0	0	1	0	1	0	0	X	2
Northern Ontario (Sonego) 🔨	1	2	0	1	0	1	2	X	7

Sheet C	1	2	3	4	5	6	7	8	Final
British Columbia (Cormack) 🔨	3	1	1	2	1	1	X	X	9
Newfoundland and Labrador (MacDonald)	0	0	0	0	0	0	X	X	0

Sheet D	1	2	3	4	5	6	7	8	Final
Quebec (Lessard) 🔨	1	1	1	2	1	0	0	X	6
Alberta (Yizek)	0	0	0	0	0	1	1	X	2

Sheet E	1	2	3	4	5	6	7	8	Final
Ontario (Gregory)	1	0	0	0	0	2	1	X	4
Manitoba (Sobkowicz) 🔨	0	1	3	2	2	0	0	X	8

=== Draw 4 ===
Tuesday, March 26, 3:00 pm

Sheet A	1	2	3	4	5	6	7	8	Final
Saskatchewan (Bender)	2	1	0	3	0	0	0	0	6
Newfoundland and Labrador (MacDonald) 🔨	0	0	1	0	2	1	3	3	10

Sheet B	1	2	3	4	5	6	7	8	Final
New Brunswick (Fitzgerald) 🔨	1	0	0	1	1	0	1	X	4
Quebec (Lessard)	0	1	2	0	0	5	0	X	8

Sheet C	1	2	3	4	5	6	7	8	Final
Nova Scotia (Hubley-Bolivar)	1	0	0	2	0	0	X	X	2
Manitoba (Sobkowicz) 🔨	0	2	2	0	4	4	X	X	12

Sheet D	1	2	3	4	5	6	7	8	Final
Northern Ontario (Sonego) 🔨	0	2	0	1	4	0	1	X	8
Ontario (Gregory)	2	0	1	0	0	2	0	X	5

Sheet E	1	2	3	4	5	6	7	8	Final
British Columbia (Cormack) 🔨	0	1	0	0	0	0	X	X	1
Alberta (Yizek)	1	0	2	3	1	1	X	X	8

=== Draw 5 ===
Wednesday, March 27, 10:00 am

Sheet A	1	2	3	4	5	6	7	8	Final
British Columbia (Cormack) 🔨	0	0	2	0	0	2	1	2	7
Manitoba (Sobkowicz)	1	1	0	1	1	0	0	0	4

Sheet B	1	2	3	4	5	6	7	8	Final
Ontario (Gregory) 🔨	1	0	1	0	1	0	0	0	3
Alberta (Yizek)	0	2	0	1	0	1	1	1	6

Sheet C	1	2	3	4	5	6	7	8	Final
Northern Ontario (Sonego) 🔨	2	0	0	0	2	0	0	X	4
Quebec (Lessard)	0	2	2	1	0	1	4	X	10

Sheet D	1	2	3	4	5	6	7	8	Final
Nova Scotia (Hubley-Bolivar)	2	1	1	1	0	2	0	X	7
Newfoundland and Labrador (MacDonald) 🔨	0	0	0	0	1	0	0	X	1

Sheet E	1	2	3	4	5	6	7	8	Final
New Brunswick (Fitzgerald)	0	4	1	0	0	0	1	0	6
Saskatchewan (Bender) 🔨	4	0	0	1	2	2	0	1	10

=== Draw 6 ===
Wednesday, March 27, 3:00 pm

Sheet A	1	2	3	4	5	6	7	8	Final
New Brunswick (Fitzgerald) 🔨	0	0	0	0	0	1	0	X	1
Northern Ontario (Sonego)	1	1	1	3	1	0	1	X	8

Sheet B	1	2	3	4	5	6	7	8	Final
Nova Scotia (Hubley-Bolivar)	0	0	2	0	0	1	0	X	3
British Columbia (Cormack) 🔨	2	1	0	1	4	0	3	X	11

Sheet C	1	2	3	4	5	6	7	8	Final
Manitoba (Sobkowicz)	0	1	0	0	0	0	2	X	3
Alberta (Yizek) 🔨	1	0	2	1	1	1	0	X	6

Sheet D	1	2	3	4	5	6	7	8	Final
Ontario (Gregory)	0	1	2	0	1	2	0	1	7
Saskatchewan (Bender) 🔨	1	0	0	2	0	0	1	0	4

Sheet E	1	2	3	4	5	6	7	8	Final
Newfoundland and Labrador (MacDonald)	0	0	1	0	0	0	X	X	1
Quebec (Lessard) 🔨	1	3	0	1	3	3	X	X	11

=== Draw 7 ===
Thursday, March 28, 12:30 pm

Sheet A	1	2	3	4	5	6	7	8	Final
Ontario (Gregory) 🔨	0	2	0	2	3	0	1	1	9
Nova Scotia (Hubley-Bolivar)	1	0	2	0	0	1	0	0	4

Sheet B	1	2	3	4	5	6	7	8	Final
Manitoba (Sobkowicz) 🔨	0	0	1	1	0	0	1	X	3
Saskatchewan (Bender)	2	2	0	0	1	2	0	X	7

Sheet C	1	2	3	4	5	6	7	8	Final
Newfoundland and Labrador (MacDonald)	2	1	0	0	2	0	0	0	5
New Brunswick (Fitzgerald) 🔨	0	0	3	1	0	2	2	1	9

Sheet D	1	2	3	4	5	6	7	8	Final
British Columbia (Cormack) 🔨	1	2	1	0	1	1	1	X	7
Quebec (Lessard)	0	0	0	2	0	0	0	X	2

Sheet E	1	2	3	4	5	6	7	8	Final
Alberta (Yizek)	0	2	0	3	0	2	0	1	8
Northern Ontario (Sonego) 🔨	1	0	2	0	1	0	2	0	6

=== Draw 8 ===
Thursday, March 28, 5:00 pm

Sheet A	1	2	3	4	5	6	7	8	Final
Quebec (Lessard)	0	3	0	4	0	0	0	2	9
Saskatchewan (Bender) 🔨	1	0	1	0	2	1	1	0	6

Sheet B	1	2	3	4	5	6	7	8	Final
Northern Ontario (Sonego)	1	0	1	0	0	0	0	X	2
Newfoundland and Labrador (MacDonald) 🔨	0	2	0	2	3	1	3	X	11

Sheet C	1	2	3	4	5	6	7	8	Final
Ontario (Gregory)	0	1	1	1	0	0	1	1	5
British Columbia (Cormack) 🔨	2	0	0	0	1	3	0	0	6

Sheet D	1	2	3	4	5	6	7	8	Final
Alberta (Yizek)	0	4	4	0	0	0	0	1	9
Nova Scotia (Hubley-Bolivar) 🔨	2	0	0	4	2	1	1	0	10

Sheet E	1	2	3	4	5	6	7	8	Final
Manitoba (Sobkowicz) 🔨	1	0	3	0	2	0	1	2	9
New Brunswick (Fitzgerald)	0	1	0	2	0	1	0	0	4

=== Draw 9 ===
Friday, March 29, 10:00 am

Sheet A	1	2	3	4	5	6	7	8	Final
Northern Ontario (Sonego)	0	1	0	1	0	0	X	X	2
British Columbia (Cormack) 🔨	3	0	3	0	1	3	X	X	10

Sheet B	1	2	3	4	5	6	7	8	Final
Alberta (Yizek)	0	2	3	0	0	2	3	X	10
New Brunswick (Fitzgerald) 🔨	1	0	0	1	1	0	0	X	3

Sheet C	1	2	3	4	5	6	7	8	Final
Saskatchewan (Bender)	0	0	0	0	4	0	X	X	4
Nova Scotia (Hubley-Bolivar) 🔨	2	2	3	4	0	1	X	X	12

Sheet D	1	2	3	4	5	6	7	8	Final
Newfoundland and Labrador (MacDonald) 🔨	0	1	0	2	1	0	0	X	4
Manitoba (Sobkowicz)	4	0	3	0	0	2	1	X	10

Sheet E	1	2	3	4	5	6	7	8	Final
Quebec (Lessard) 🔨	0	1	3	1	2	3	0	X	10
Ontario (Gregory)	1	0	0	0	0	0	0	X	1

== Playoffs ==
Page playoff system
1	Quebec	10
2	British Columbia	4
3	Alberta	8
4	Northern Ontario	4

Semifinal
2	British Columbia	8
3	Alberta	7

Gold Medal Game
1	Quebec	10
2	British Columbia	2

=== 1 vs. 2 ===
Saturday, March 30, 10:00

Sheet C	1	2	3	4	5	6	7	8	Final
Quebec (Lessard) 🔨	0	2	4	1	0	0	3	X	10
British Columbia (Cormack)	2	0	0	0	2	0	0	X	4

=== 3 vs. 4 ===
Saturday, March 30, 15:00

Sheet C	1	2	3	4	5	6	7	8	Final
Alberta (Yizek) 🔨	1	1	1	3	0	0	2	X	8
Northern Ontario (Sonego)	0	0	0	0	2	2	0	X	4

=== Semifinal ===
Sunday, March 31, 10:00 am

Sheet C	1	2	3	4	5	6	7	8	Final
British Columbia (Cormack) 🔨	1	0	2	2	2	0	0	1	8
Alberta (Yizek)	0	3	0	0	0	1	3	0	7

=== Gold medal game ===
Sunday, March 31, 3:00 pm

Sheet C	1	2	3	4	5	6	7	8	Final
Quebec (Lessard) 🔨	4	1	0	2	1	0	2	X	10
British Columbia (Cormack)	0	0	1	0	0	1	0	X	2

== Awards ==
The awards and the all-star team are listed as follows:

=== All-star team ===
- Leads: Johanne Daly, Quebec; Alison Duddy, British Columbia
- Second: Mark Wherrett, Manitoba
- Third: Frank LaBounty, British Columbia
- Skip: Benoit Lessard, Quebec

=== Sportsmanship award ===
- Sébastian Boisvert, Quebec second
