= Collinda Joseph =

Canadian wheelchair curler

- Curler
- Born: Collinda Patricia Joseph; May 15, 1965 (age 61); Ottawa, Ontario, Canada

Team
- Curling club: RA Curling Club, Ottawa, ON
- Skip: Mark Ideson
- Third: Jon Thurston
- Second: Ina Forrest
- Lead: Collinda Joseph
- Alternate: Gil Dash

Curling career
- Member Association: Canada
- World Wheelchair Championship: 3 (2019, 2020, 2025)
- Paralympic: 2 (2022, 2026)
Medal record
Wheelchair curling
Representing Canada
Paralympic Games
Gold medal – first place	2026 Milano Cortina	Mixed team
Bronze medal – third place	2022 Beijing	Mixed team
World Wheelchair Championship
Silver medal – second place	2020 Wetzikon	Mixed team
Bronze medal – third place	2025 Stevenston	Mixed Team
World Wheelchair Mixed Doubles Championship
Bronze medal – third place	2023 Richmond

Collinda Patricia Joseph (born May 15, 1965) is a Canadian wheelchair curler from Stittsville, Ontario. She was part of Canada's gold medal mixed team at the 2026 Winter Paralympics and bronze medal mixed team at the 2022 Winter Paralympics.

== Early life and education ==
Joseph was born and raised in Ottawa. In 1983 at age 18, she was in a train accident in France which caused a spinal cord injury. Prior to her injury, she was a competitive diver. After her injury, Joseph explored adaptive sports such as wheelchair tennis, skiing, track and field, and, finally, wheelchair basketball.

She attended Carleton University and then Algonquin College.

== Career ==
Joseph played wheelchair basketball for 15 years. She has been involved in wheelchair curling since 2006. She first tried wheelchair curling at a RBC-sponsored “Give It A Go” event organized by her rehab clinic. She began being invited to national team training camps in 2012.

Joseph competed for Canada in the 2019, 2020, 2021 World Wheelchair Curling Championships. She won a silver medal in the mixed team competition at the 2020 World Wheelchair Curling Championship. She made her Paralympic debut in 2022 on a team with Dennis Thiessen, Ina Forrest, Jon Thurston and Mark Ideson. They won bronze in mixed team wheelchair curling.

Joseph competed in the World Mixed Doubles Wheelchair Curling Championships with Dennis Thiessen in 2023, only the second year the event was held. They lost their semi-final to the United States, but defeated China in the bronze medal match for a third-place finish. She represented Canada at the 2025 World Wheelchair Curling Championship, serving as the team's lead and winning bronze to secure team Canada a spot in the 2026 Winter Paralympics. The team won gold at the inaugural wheelchair event at the Grand Slam of Curling in September 2025.

Outside of her curling career, Joseph has worked for Accessibility Standards Canada and the National Research Council of Canada.

=== Teams ===
Season	Skip	Third	Second	Lead	Alternate	Coach	Events
2012–13	Ken Gregory	Collinda Joseph	Jon Thurston	Chrissy Molnar		Carl Rennick	CWhCC 2013 (7th)
2015–16	Collinda Joseph	Doug Morris	Jon Thurston	Ross Nicholson			CWhCC 2016 (8th)
2018–19	Jim Armstrong	Collinda Joseph	Jonathon Thurston	Reid Mulligan		Bruce Gorsline	CWhCC 2019 (bronze)
2018–19	Mark Ideson	Collinda Joseph	Jon Thurston	Marie Wright	Ina Forrest	Wayne Kiel	WWhCC 2019 (10th)
2019–20	Jon Thurston (fourth)	Ina Forrest	Dennis Thiessen	Mark Ideson (skip)	Collinda Joseph	Wayne Kiel, Michael Lizmore	WWhCC 2020 (silver)
2024–25	Jon Thurston	Gil Dash	Doug Dean	Collinda Joseph	Chrissy Molnar	Michael Lizmore	WWhCC 2025 (bronze)

== Personal life ==
Joseph resides in Stittsville, Ottawa. She and her husband, Euan MacKellar, have two children.

== Awards and recognition ==
In 2022, Joseph was given “Changing Lives” award, as part of Algonquin College’s Alumni of Distinction Awards. In 2023, she was inducted into the Governor General’s Curling Club, Canada's equivalent of a national hall of fame for curling. She has also been recognized with the Queen Elizabeth II Diamond Jubilee Medal, the Celebration of People’s Community Leader Award, the Commonwealth Youth Secretariat’s Youth Service Award, Algonquin College’s Community Leader Award in memory of Cathy Kerr, Human Resources and Skills Development Canada Deputy Minister’s Award for outstanding achievement for excellence in service to Canadians, and Carleton University’s Honour Award for Service.
