= Gary Cormack =

Canadian wheelchair curler (1950–2024)

- Curler ♂
- Born: May 27, 1950; Kenora, Ontario, Canada
- Died: November 4, 2024 (aged 74); Surrey, British Columbia, Canada

Team
- Curling club: Tunnel Town Curling Club, Delta, BC, Richmond Curling Centre, Richmond, BC

Curling career
- Member Association: British Columbia; Canada
- World Wheelchair Championship: 3 (2005, 2007, 2008)
- Paralympic: 1 (2006)
Medal record
Wheelchair curling
Representing Canada
Winter Paralympics
Gold medal – first place	2006 Turin
Canadian Wheelchair Curling Championship
Gold medal – first place	2006 Richmond
Representing British Columbia
Canadian Wheelchair Curling Championship
Gold medal – first place	2010 Kelowna
Silver medal – second place	2013 Ottawa

Gary Cormack (May 27, 1950 – November 4, 2024) was a Canadian wheelchair curler. He was the 2006 Winter Paralympics champion. Cormack died at the Surrey Memorial Hospital on November 4, 2024, aged 74.

== Teams ==
Season	Skip	Third	Second	Lead	Alternate	Coach	Events
2005–06	Chris Daw	Gerry Austgarden	Gary Cormack	Sonja Gaudet	Karen Blachford (WPG)		CWhCC 2006 (gold); WPG 2006 (gold)
2006–07	Chris Daw	Gerry Austgarden	Gary Cormack	Sonja Gaudet	Ina Forrest	Joe Rea	WWhCC 2007 (4th)
2007–08	Darryl Neighbour	Gerry Austgarden	Ina Forrest	Sonja Gaudet	Gary Cormack	Joe Rea	WWhCC 2008 (4th)
2009–10	Gary Cormack	Rich Green	Vince Miele	Corinne Jensen	Samantha Siu	Len Stewart	CWhCC 2010 (gold)
2010–11	Gary Cormack	Frank LaBounty	Vince Miele	Alison Duddy			CWhCC 2011 (4th)
2012–13	Gary Cormack	Frank LaBounty	Vince Miele	Alison Duddy	Samantha Siu	Karen Watson	CWhCC 2013 (silver)
2013–14	Darryl Neighbour	Frank LaBounty	Vince Miele	Alison Duddy	Gary Cormack	Karen Watson	CWhCC 2014 (5th)
2018–19	Darryl Neighbour	Bob Macdonald	Gary Cormack	Janice Ing		Vic Shimizu	CWhCC 2019 (9th)
2019–20	Bob Macdonald	Alison Duddy	Gary Cormack	Vince Miele			
