= Jon Thurston =

Canadian wheelchair curler

- Curler
- Born: February 3, 1984 (age 42); Dunsford, Ontario, Canada

Team
- Curling club: Peterborough Curling Club, Peterborough, ON; Bobcaygeon Curling Club, Bobcaygeon, ON
- Skip: Mark Ideson
- Third: Jon Thurston
- Second: Ina Forrest
- Lead: Collinda Joseph
- Alternate: Gil Dash

Curling career
- Member Association: Canada
- World Wheelchair Championship: 6 (2019, 2020, 2021, 2023, 2024, 2025)
- Paralympic: 2 (2022, 2026)
Medal record
Wheelchair curling
Paralympic Games
Gold medal – first place	2026 Milano Cortina	Mixed team
Bronze medal – third place	2022 Beijing	Mixed team
World Wheelchair Championship
Silver medal – second place	2020 Wetzikon	Mixed Team
Silver medal – second place	2023 Richmond	Mixed Team
Silver medal – second place	2024 Gangneung	Mixed Team
Bronze medal – third place	2025 Stevenston	Mixed Team

Jonathan “Jon" Thurston (born February 3, 1984, in Dunsford, Ontario) is a Canadian wheelchair curler.

== Teams ==
Season	Skip	Third	Second	Lead	Alternate	Coach	Events
2012–13	Ken Gregory	Collinda Joseph	Jon Thurston	Chrissy Molnar		Carl Rennick	CWhCC 2013 (7th)
2015–16	Collinda Joseph	Doug Morris	Jon Thurston	Ross Nicholson			CWhCC 2016 (8th)
2018–19	Jim Armstrong	Collinda Joseph	Jonathon Thurston	Reid Mulligan		Bruce Gorsline	CWhCC 2019 (bronze)
2018–19	Mark Ideson	Collinda Joseph	Jon Thurston	Marie Wright	Ina Forrest	Wayne Kiel	WWhCC 2019 (10th)
2019–20	Jon Thurston (Fourth)	Ina Forrest	Dennis Thiessen	Mark Ideson (Skip)	Collinda Joseph	Wayne Kiel, Michael Lizmore	WWhCC 2020 (silver)
2020–21	Jon Thurston (Fourth)	Ina Forrest	Dennis Thiessen	Mark Ideson (Skip)	Collinda Joseph	Michael Lizmore	WWhCC 2021 (5th)
2021–22	Jon Thurston (Fourth)	Ina Forrest	Dennis Thiessen	Mark Ideson (Skip)	Collinda Joseph	Michael Lizmore	WPG 2022 (bronze)
2022–23	Jon Thurston (Fourth)	Ina Forrest	Gil Dash	Mark Ideson (Skip)	Marie Wright	Michael Lizmore	WWhCC 2023 (silver)
2023–24	Jon Thurston (Fourth)	Ina Forrest	Gil Dash	Mark Ideson (Skip)	Chrissy Molnar	Michael Lizmore	WWhCC 2024 (silver)
2024–25	Jon Thurston (Fourth)	Gil Dash (Skip)	Doug Dean	Collinda Joseph	Chrissy Molnar	Michael Lizmore	WWhCC 2025 (bronze)
