= Gil Dash =

Canadian wheelchair curler (born 1968)

Gilbert Dash
- Curler
- Born: April 14, 1968 (age 58); Kipling, Saskatchewan

Curling career
- Member Association: Canada
- World Wheelchair Championship: 3 (2023, 2024, 2025)
- Paralympic: 1 (2026)
Medal record
Wheelchair curling
Representing Canada
Paralympic Games
Gold medal – first place	2026 Milano Cortina	Mixed team
World Championships
Silver medal – second place	2023 Richmond	Mixed team
Silver medal – second place	2024 Gangneung	Mixed team
Bronze medal – third place	2025 Stevenston	Mixed team

Gilbert "Gil" Dash (born April 14, 1968) is a Canadian wheelchair curler from Kipling, Saskatchewan.

== Career ==
Dash represented Canada at the 2026 Winter Paralympics.

== Personal life ==
Dash broke his back and suffered spinal cord damage after a ski-jumping accident in 2006.

== Teams ==
=== Mixed team ===
Season	Skip	Third	Second	Lead	Alternate	Coach	Events
2010–11	Darwin Bender	Gil Dash	Marie Wright	Terry Hart	Calvin Bird	Lorraine Arguin, Bob Capp	2011 CWhC (7th)
2011–12	Darwin Bender	Gil Dash	Marie Wright	Larry Schrader		Lorraine Arguin, Bob Capp	2012 CWhC (gold)
2012–13	Darwin Bender	Gil Dash	Marie Wright	Larry Schrader		Lorraine Arguin, Bob Capp	2013 CWhC (9th)
2013–14	Darwin Bender	Gil Dash	Marie Wright	Larry Schrader		Lorraine Arguin	2014 CWhC (5th)
2015–16	Darwin Bender	Marie Wright	Gil Dash	Larry Schrader			2016 CWhC (gold)
2017–18	Marie Wright	Gil Dash	Darwin Bender	Larry Schrader			2018 CWhC (gold)
2018–19	Marie Wright	Gil Dash	Darwin Bender	Moose Gibson		Lorraine Arguin	2019 CWhC (5th)
2022–23	Gil Dash	Marie Wright	Darwin Bender	Moose Gibson		Lorraine Arguin	2023 CWhC (gold)
2022–23	Jon Thurston (fourth)	Ina Forrest	Gil Dash	Mark Ideson (skip)	Marie Wright	Michael Lizmore	WWhCC 2023 (silver)
2023–24	Gil Dash	Marie Wright	Moose Gibson	Sheryl Pederson		Lorraine Arguin	2024 CWhC (gold)
2023–24	Jon Thurston (fourth)	Ina Forrest	Gil Dash	Mark Ideson (skip)	Chrissy Molnar	Michael Lizmore	WWhCC 2024 (silver)
2024–25	Gil Dash	Marie Wright	Darwin Bender	Moose Gibson		Lorraine Arguin	2025 CWhC (8th)
2024–25	Jon Thurston (fourth)	Gil Dash (skip)	Doug Dean	Collinda Joseph	Chrissy Molnar	Michael Lizmore	WWhCC 2025 (bronze)
2025–26	Mark Ideson	Jon Thurston	Ina Forrest	Collinda Joseph	Gilbert Dash	Michael Lizmore	2026 WPG (gold)
