= Chris Sobkowicz =

Canadian wheelchair curler

- Curler ♂
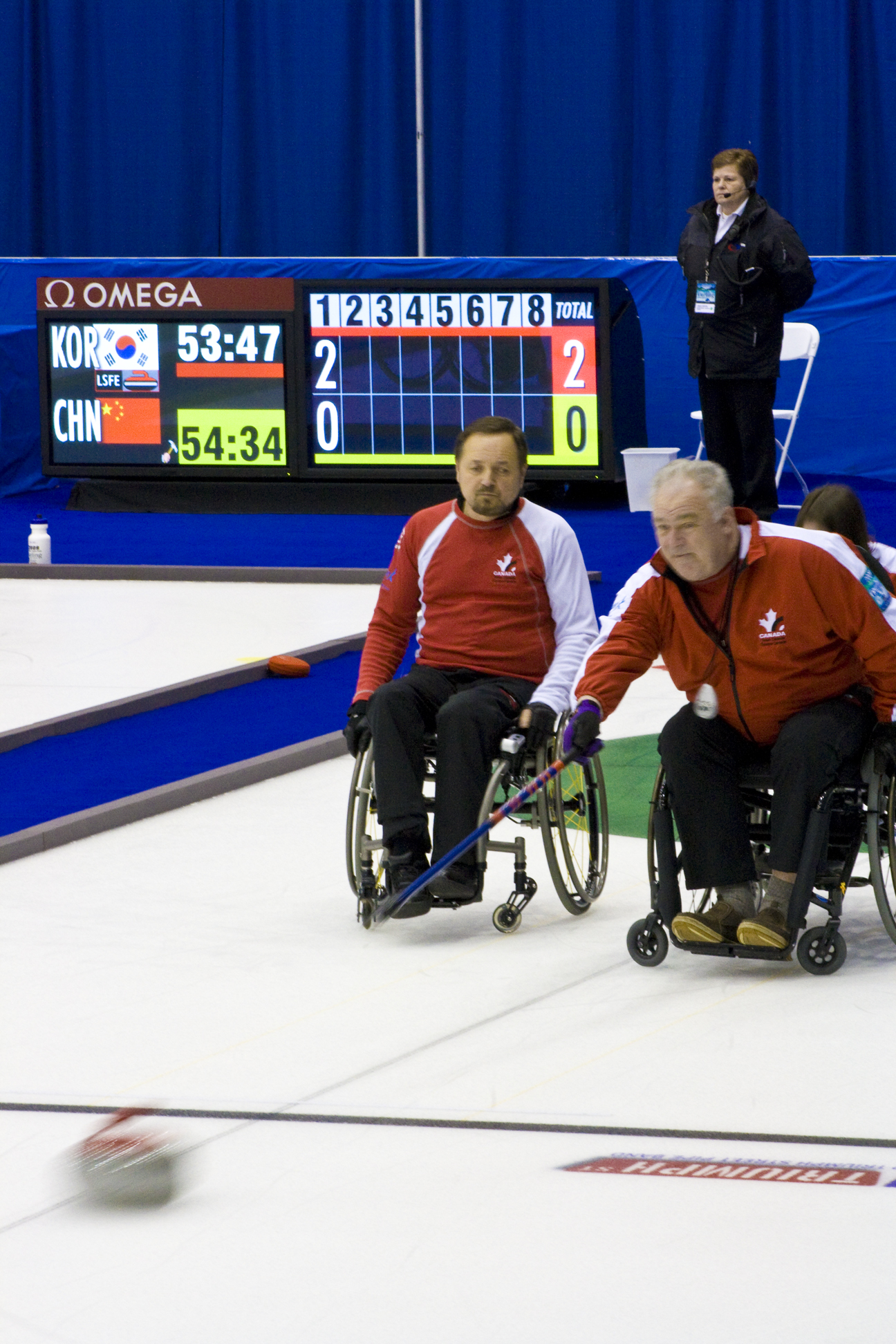
- Chris Sobkowicz and Jim Armstrong at the 2009 World Wheelchair Curling Championship
- Born: June 12, 1953
- Died: December 23, 2024 (aged 71)

Team
- Curling club: Assiniboine Memorial CC, Winnipeg, MB

Curling career
- Member Association: Canada
- World Wheelchair Championship: 1 (2009)
Medal record
Wheelchair curling
World Wheelchair Championship
Gold medal – first place	2009 Vancouver
Canadian Wheelchair Championship
Gold medal – first place	2011 Edmonton

Christopher Allen "Chris" Sobkowicz (born June 12, 1953, died December 23, 2024) was a Canadian wheelchair curler from Manitoba.

At the international level, he was a 2009 World wheelchair champion curler.

At the national level, he was a 2011 Canadian wheelchair champion curler.

He died December 23, 2024 at age 71 after a courageous battle with cancer.

== Teams ==
Season	Skip	Third	Second	Lead	Alternate	Coach	Events
2008–09	Jim Armstrong	Darryl Neighbour	Ina Forrest	Chris Sobkowicz	Sonja Gaudet	Joe Rea	WWhCC 2009 (gold)
2010–11	Chris Sobkowicz	Dennis Thiessen	Melissa Lecuyer	George Horning	Don Kalinsky		CWhCC 2011 (gold)
2012–13	Chris Sobkowicz	Dennis Thiessen	Mark Wherrett	Melissa Lecuyer	Doris Peloquin		CWhCC 2013 (5th)
