= Zhang Mingliang =

Chinese male wheelchair curler

- Curler ♂
- Born: 5 January 1987 (age 39); Handan, China

Curling career
- Member Association: China
- World Wheelchair Championship: 5 (2017, 2019, 2020, 2023, 2025)
- Paralympic: 2 (2022, 2026)
Medal record
Wheelchair curling
Representing China
Winter Paralympics
Gold medal – first place	2022 Beijing	Mixed team
Silver medal – second place	2026 Milano Cortina	Mixed team
World Wheelchair Championship
Gold medal – first place	2019 Stirling	Mixed Team
Gold medal – first place	2021 Beijing	Mixed Team
Gold medal – first place	2023 Richmond	Mixed Team
Gold medal – first place	2025 Stevenston	Mixed Team

Zhang Mingliang ( Chinese: 张明亮)(born 5 January 1987 in Handan) is a Chinese wheelchair curler, 2019, 2021 and 2025 World Champion.

== Teams ==
Season	Skip	Third	Second	Lead	Alternate	Coach	Events
2016–17	Wang Haitao	Liu Wei	Chen Jianxin	Xu Guangqin	Zhang Mingliang	Li Jianrui	WWhCC 2017 (4th)
2018–19	Wang Haitao	Zhang Mingliang	Xu Xinchen	Yan Zhuo	Zhang Qiang	Li Jianrui	WWhCC 2019 (1st) (gold)
2019–20	Wang Haitao	Chen Jianxin	Liu Wei	Wang Meng	Zhang Mingliang	Li Jianrui	WWhCC 2020 (4th)
2021–22	Wang Haitao	Chen Jianxin	Zhang Mingliang	Yan Zhuo	Sun Yulong	Yue Qingshuang	WWhCC 2021 (1st) (gold); 2022 PWG (1st) (gold)
2022–23	Wang Haitao	Zhang Shuaiyu	Yang Jinqiao	Li Nana	Zhang Mingliang	Yue Qingshuang	WWhCC 2023 (1st) (gold)
2024–25	Wang Haitao	Chen Jianxin	Zhang Mingliang	Li Nana	Zhang Qiang	Yue Qingshuang	WWhCC 2025 (gold)
