= William Dolan =

American politician

Member of the New Hampshire House of Representatives from the Hillsborough 9th district
- Incumbent
- Assumed office December 7, 2022
- Succeeded by: Rich Green (elect)

Personal details
- Party: Democratic
- Education: Suffolk University (BA, MBA, JD)

William Dolan is an American politician and attorney. He serves as a Democratic member of the New Hampshire House of Representatives for the Hillsborough 9th district.

== Biography ==
Dolan graduated from Suffolk University in 2013 with a Bachelor of Arts in history and Spanish. He then earned both his Master of Business Administration from the Sawyer Business School and his Juris Doctor from Suffolk University Law School in 2017.

Dolan has worked as an attorney in private practice since 2017.

== Publications ==
- "You can speak truth to power, but you can't make it listen." New Hampshire Union Leader, November 26, 2024
