= Sun Yulong =

Chinese wheelchair curler

- Curler ♂
- Born: 1 September 1988 (age 38); Cangzhou, Hebei, China

Curling career
- Member Association: China
- World Wheelchair Championship: 2 (2016, 2021)
- Paralympic: 1 (2022)
Medal record
Wheelchair curling
Representing China
Winter Paralympics
Gold medal – first place	2022 Beijing	Mixed team
World Wheelchair Championship
Gold medal – first place	2021 Beijing

Sun Yulong ( Chinese: 孙玉龙)(born 1 September 1988 in Cangzhou, China) is a Chinese wheelchair curler, 2022 Paralympics champion, 2021 World Champion.

== Teams ==
Season	Skip	Third	Second	Lead	Alternate	Coach	Events
2015–16	Sun Yulong (fourth)	Yu Xinyue	Chen Jianxin (skip)	Xu Lichun	Chen Tao	Ru Xia	WWhCC 2016 (5th)
2021–22	Wang Haitao	Chen Jianxin	Zhang Mingliang	Yan Zhuo	Sun Yulong	Yue Qingshuang, Zhao Ran (WWhCC)	WWhCC 2021 (gold); PWG 2022 (gold)
