= Wheelchair curling at the 2022 Winter Paralympics =

Wheelchair curling at the XIII Paralympic Winter Games
- Venue: Beijing National Aquatics Centre
- Dates: 5–12 March
- Competitors: 54 from 11 nations

Medalists
1st place, gold medalist(s)		China
2nd place, silver medalist(s)		Sweden
3rd place, bronze medalist(s)		Canada

The wheelchair curling competition of the 2022 Winter Paralympics was held from 5 to 12 March 2022 at the Beijing National Aquatics Centre in Beijing, China.

== Medalists ==
Event	Gold	Silver	Bronze
Mixed	China; Wang Haitao; Chen Jianxin; Zhang Mingliang; Yan Zhuo; Sun Yulong	Sweden; Viljo Petersson-Dahl; Ronny Persson; Mats-Ola Engborg; Kristina Ulander; Sabina Johansson	Canada; Jon Thurston; Ina Forrest; Dennis Thiessen; Mark Ideson; Collinda Joseph

== Qualification ==
Qualification for the 2022 Paralympics was based on rankings in the 2019, 2020, and 2021 World Wheelchair Curling Championships. The qualification points are allotted based on the nations' final rankings at the World Championships. The points are distributed as shown in the table below. The eleven countries with the most points were to qualify for the Beijing Games, while the twelfth slot was reserved for the host country, China. Because the Chinese team placed within the top eleven point-scorers, the twelfth slot was given to the twelfth-ranked team, Estonia.

Final rank	1	2	3	4	5	6	7	8	9	10	11	12
Points	14	12	10	9	8	7	6	5	4	3	2	1

=== Rankings ===
Key
Nations qualified for the Paralympic Games
Host nation (automatic qualification)

Country	(Scotland) 2019	(Switzerland) 2020	(China) 2021	Total
China	14	9	14	37
~~RPC~~^{1}	~~6~~	~~14~~	~~10~~	~~30~~
Canada	3	12	8	23
Great Britain^{2}	12	4	7	23
Norway	9	8	6	23
Sweden	0	10	12	22
South Korea	10	7	4	21
Latvia	4	6	5	15
Slovakia	7	5	3	15
United States	2	0	9	11
Switzerland	8	2	1	11
Estonia	5	3	0	8

Notes

1. After qualifying, athletes representing the RPC were denied entry into the 2022 Winter Paralympics due to the 2022 Russian invasion of Ukraine.
2. Scotland, England and Wales all compete separately (Northern Ireland competes as part of a team from the island of Ireland) at the World Wheelchair Curling Championship. Under an agreement between the curling federations of those three home nations, only qualification points earned by Scotland count toward the point total for Great Britain.

== Teams ==
The teams are listed as follows:

Canada	China	Estonia	Great Britain
Fourth: Jon Thurston; Third: Ina Forrest; Second: Dennis Thiessen; Skip: Mark Ideson; Alternate: Collinda Joseph; Coach: Mick Lizmore	Skip: Wang Haitao; Third: Chen Jianxin; Second: Zhang Mingliang; Lead: Yan Zhuo; Alternate: Sun Yulong; Coach: Yue Qingshuang	Skip: Andrei Koitmäe; Third: Lauri Murasov; Second: Mait Mätas; Lead: Katlin Riidebach; Alternate: Signe Falkenberg; Coach: Christopher Bowden	Fourth: Gregor Ewan; Skip: Hugh Nibloe; Second: David Melrose; Lead: Meggan Dawson-Farrell; Alternate: Gary Smith; Coach: Sheila Swan
Latvia	Norway	Slovakia	South Korea
Skip: Poļina Rožkova; Third: Sergejs Djačenko; Second: Agris Lasmans; Lead: Ojārs Briedis; Alternate: Aleksandrs Dimbovskis; Coach: Arnis Veidemanis	Skip: Jostein Stordahl; Third: Ole Fredrik Syversen; Second: Geir Arne Skogstad; Lead: Sissel Løchen; Alternate: Mia Sveberg; Coach: Peter Dahlman	Fourth: Peter Zaťko; Skip: Radoslav Ďuriš; Second: Dušan Pitoňák; Lead: Monika Kunkelová; Alternate: Alena Kánová; Coach: František Pitoňák	Skip: Go Seung-nam; Third: Jang Jae-hyuk; Second: Jung Sung-hun; Lead: Baek Hye-jin; Alternate: Yoon Eun-gu; Coach: Kim Seung-min
Sweden	Switzerland	United States	
Skip: Viljo Petersson-Dahl; Third: Ronny Persson; Second: Mats-Ola Engborg; Lead: Kristina Ulander; Alternate: Sabina Johansson; Coach: Alison Kreviazuk	Fourth: Hans Burgener; Skip: Laurent Kneubühl; Second: Françoise Jaquerod; Lead: Cynthia Mathez; Alternate: Patrick Delacrétaz; Coach: Stephan Pfister	Skip: Matthew Thums; Third: Stephen Emt; Second: David Samsa; Lead: Batoyun Uranchimeg; Alternate: Pamela Wilson; Coach: Russell Schieber	

== Round-robin standings ==
Final round-robin standings

Key
Teams to Playoffs

Country	Skip	W	L	W–L	PF	PA	EW	EL	BE	SE	S%	DSC
China	Wang Haitao	8	2	–	68	39	36	28	2	13	71%	122.32
Slovakia	Radoslav Ďuriš	7	3	2–0	65	57	40	33	1	16	65%	95.19
Sweden	Viljo Petersson-Dahl	7	3	1–1	66	52	37	35	3	18	68%	91.08
Canada	Mark Ideson	7	3	0–2	69	50	36	33	2	11	71%	95.29
United States	Matthew Thums	5	5	1–0	60	75	32	39	2	6	60%	70.98
South Korea	Go Seung-nam	5	5	0–1	64	59	35	37	0	11	64%	103.20
Norway	Jostein Stordahl	4	6	2–0	60	64	37	38	2	13	64%	107.82
Great Britain	Hugh Nibloe	4	6	1–1	67	56	37	36	0	16	62%	134.75
Latvia	Poļina Rožkova	4	6	0–2	61	71	40	32	0	18	63%	100.43
Estonia	Andrei Koitmäe	3	7	–	51	69	32	41	2	13	61%	106.21
Switzerland	Laurent Kneubühl	1	9	–	48	87	32	42	0	8	56%	109.27

Wheelchair curling round robin summary table
Pos.	Country	Canada	China	Estonia	Great Britain	Japan	Norway	Slovakia	South Korea	Sweden	Switzerland	United States	Record
4	Canada	—N/a	7–3	9–3	6–3	10–3	7–6	8–9	4–9	3–6	8–4	7–4	7–3
1	China	3–7	—	9–3	6–3	9–2	7–4	7–5	9–4	1–5	7–4	10–2	8–2
10	Estonia	3–9	3–9	—	5–10	6–5	8–3	6–7	2–5	4–6	8–6	6–9	3–7
8	Great Britain	3–6	3–6	10–5	—	8–4	5–7	3–7	6–8	4–6	15–1	10–6	4–6
9	Latvia	3–10	2–9	5–6	4–8	—	6–8	8–4	8–4	9–7	9–7	7–8	4–6
7	Norway	6–7	4–7	3–8	7–5	8–6	—	9–3	4–9	6–8	8–5	5–6	4–6
2	Slovakia	9–8	5–7	7–6	7–3	4–8	3–9	—	7–2	6–5	8–6	9–3	7–3
6	South Korea	9–4	4–9	5–2	8–6	4–8	9–4	2–7	—	10–4	7–8	6–7	5–5
3	Sweden	6–3	5–1	6–4	6–4	7–9	8–6	5–6	4–10	—	9–2	10–7	7–3
11	Switzerland	4–8	4–7	6–8	1–15	7–9	5–8	6–8	8–7	2–9	—	5–8	1–9
5	United States	4–7	2–10	9–6	6–10	8–7	6–5	3–9	7–6	7–10	8–5	—	5–5

== Round-robin results ==
All draw times are listed in China Standard Time (UTC+08:00).

=== Draw 1 ===
Saturday, March 5, 14:35

Sheet A	1	2	3	4	5	6	7	8	Final
Switzerland (Kneubühl)	0	0	0	1	0	0	1	X	2
Sweden (Petersson-Dahl)	2	2	1	0	3	1	0	X	9

Sheet B	1	2	3	4	5	6	7	8	Final
China (Wang)	1	0	1	0	0	1	0	X	3
Canada (Ideson)	0	1	0	3	1	0	2	X	7

Sheet C	1	2	3	4	5	6	7	8	Final
Slovakia (Ďuriš)	2	4	0	1	0	1	1	X	9
United States (Thums)	0	0	1	0	2	0	0	X	3

Sheet D	1	2	3	4	5	6	7	8	Final
Norway (Stordahl)	0	2	2	0	0	1	2	0	7
Great Britain (Nibloe)	1	0	0	1	2	0	0	1	5

=== Draw 2 ===
Saturday, March 5, 19:35

Sheet A	1	2	3	4	5	6	7	8	Final
Latvia (Rožkova)	1	0	3	1	0	2	1	X	8
South Korea (Go)	0	2	0	0	2	0	0	X	4

Sheet B	1	2	3	4	5	6	7	8	Final
United States (Thums)	2	1	0	2	0	1	0	0	6
Great Britain (Nibloe)	0	0	3	0	2	0	2	3	10

Sheet D	1	2	3	4	5	6	7	8	Final
Canada (Ideson)	0	3	0	0	3	0	2	X	8
Switzerland (Kneubühl)	0	0	1	1	0	2	0	X	4

=== Draw 3 ===
Sunday, March 6, 9:35

Sheet B	1	2	3	4	5	6	7	8	Final
Slovakia (Ďuriš)	0	0	0	0	3	0	0	X	3
Norway (Stordahl)	1	0	2	1	0	3	2	X	9

Sheet C	1	2	3	4	5	6	7	8	Final
China (Wang)	0	0	0	0	0	0	1	X	1
Sweden (Petersson-Dahl)	0	1	0	1	2	1	0	X	5

=== Draw 4 ===
Sunday, March 6, 14:35

Sheet B	1	2	3	4	5	6	7	8	EE	Final
Switzerland (Kneubühl)	1	0	1	0	3	0	0	2	1	8
South Korea (Go)	0	4	0	1	0	1	1	0	0	7

Sheet C	1	2	3	4	5	6	7	8	Final
Canada (Ideson)	4	0	0	2	4	0	X	X	10
Latvia (Rožkova)	0	1	1	0	0	1	X	X	3

Sheet D	1	2	3	4	5	6	7	8	Final
Estonia (Koitmäe)	1	0	0	2	0	1	2	0	6
United States (Thums)	0	3	0	0	4	0	0	2	9

=== Draw 5 ===
Sunday, March 6, 19:35

Sheet A	1	2	3	4	5	6	7	8	Final
Estonia (Koitmäe)	0	0	1	0	0	2	0	X	3
China (Wang)	3	1	0	2	1	0	2	X	9

Sheet C	1	2	3	4	5	6	7	8	Final
South Korea (Go)	2	0	2	1	0	0	4	X	9
Norway (Stordahl)	0	2	0	0	1	1	0	X	4

Sheet D	1	2	3	4	5	6	7	8	Final
Slovakia (Ďuriš)	1	0	1	2	0	0	0	X	4
Latvia (Rožkova)	0	2	0	0	1	2	3	X	8

=== Draw 6 ===
Monday, March 7, 9:35

Sheet A	1	2	3	4	5	6	7	8	Final
United States (Thums)	0	0	1	0	0	1	2	X	4
Canada (Ideson)	2	0	0	3	2	0	0	X	7

Sheet B	1	2	3	4	5	6	7	8	Final
Latvia (Rožkova)	0	0	1	1	1	2	0	0	5
Estonia (Koitmäe)	2	2	0	0	0	0	1	1	6

Sheet C	1	2	3	4	5	6	7	8	Final
Switzerland (Kneubühl)	0	0	0	0	1	0	X	X	1
Great Britain (Nibloe)	4	1	5	1	0	4	X	X	15

=== Draw 7 ===
Monday, March 7, 14:35

Sheet A	1	2	3	4	5	6	7	8	Final
Norway (Stordahl)	2	0	0	0	0	0	1	X	3
Estonia (Koitmäe)	0	1	2	1	1	3	0	X	8

Sheet B	1	2	3	4	5	6	7	8	Final
South Korea (Go)	0	3	0	0	1	0	X	X	4
China (Wang)	2	0	1	1	0	5	X	X	9

Sheet D	1	2	3	4	5	6	7	8	Final
Latvia (Rožkova)	3	1	0	1	0	3	0	1	9
Sweden (Petersson-Dahl)	0	0	2	0	2	0	3	0	7

=== Draw 8 ===
Monday, March 7, 19:35

Sheet A	1	2	3	4	5	6	7	8	Final
China (Wang)	1	0	1	0	3	0	0	2	7
Switzerland (Kneubühl)	0	1	0	2	0	1	0	0	4

Sheet B	1	2	3	4	5	6	7	8	Final
Great Britain (Nibloe)	0	1	0	0	1	0	1	0	3
Slovakia (Ďuriš)	1	0	2	2	0	1	0	1	7

Sheet C	1	2	3	4	5	6	7	8	Final
Sweden (Petersson-Dahl)	1	0	2	2	0	0	1	X	6
Canada (Ideson)	0	1	0	0	1	1	0	X	3

Sheet D	1	2	3	4	5	6	7	8	Final
United States (Thums)	1	0	0	0	1	0	2	2	6
Norway (Syversen)	0	2	1	1	0	1	0	0	5

=== Draw 9 ===
Tuesday, March 8, 9:35

Sheet B	1	2	3	4	5	6	7	8	Final
Switzerland (Kneubühl)	0	1	0	0	3	3	0	0	7
Latvia (Rožkova)	3	0	2	1	0	0	2	2	9

Sheet C	1	2	3	4	5	6	7	8	Final
Great Britain (Nibloe)	0	3	2	0	4	1	0	X	10
Estonia (Koitmäe)	1	0	0	3	0	0	1	X	5

Sheet D	1	2	3	4	5	6	7	8	Final
South Korea (Baek)	0	1	1	2	0	4	0	1	9
Canada (Ideson)	0	0	0	0	2	0	2	0	4

=== Draw 10 ===
Tuesday, March 8, 14:35

Sheet A	1	2	3	4	5	6	7	8	Final
Slovakia (Ďuriš)	1	1	1	1	1	0	2	X	7
South Korea (Go)	0	0	0	0	0	2	0	X	2

Sheet B	1	2	3	4	5	6	7	8	Final
Sweden (Petersson-Dahl)	1	0	0	2	1	0	1	1	6
Estonia (Koitmäe)	0	1	1	0	0	2	0	0	4

Sheet C	1	2	3	4	5	6	7	8	Final
Latvia (Rožkova)	2	0	0	1	2	0	1	0	6
Norway (Syversen)	0	0	2	0	0	3	0	3	8

=== Draw 11 ===
Tuesday, March 8, 19:35

Sheet A	1	2	3	4	5	6	7	8	Final
Great Britain (Nibloe)	0	0	0	0	1	1	1	1	4
Sweden (Petersson-Dahl)	0	3	2	1	0	0	0	0	6

Sheet B	1	2	3	4	5	6	7	8	Final
Canada (Ideson)	1	1	0	1	0	4	0	1	8
Slovakia (Ďuriš)	0	0	2	0	4	0	3	0	9

Sheet C	1	2	3	4	5	6	7	8	Final
China (Wang)	0	5	0	3	2	0	X	X	10
United States (Thums)	0	0	1	0	0	1	X	X	2

Sheet D	1	2	3	4	5	6	7	8	Final
Norway (Syversen)	0	2	0	2	2	1	0	1	8
Switzerland (Kneubühl)	2	0	2	0	0	0	1	0	5

=== Draw 12 ===
Wednesday, March 9, 9:35

Sheet B	1	2	3	4	5	6	7	8	EE	Final
Norway (Syversen)	1	0	2	0	0	0	1	2	0	6
Sweden (Petersson-Dahl)	0	1	0	2	2	1	0	0	2	8

Sheet C	1	2	3	4	5	6	7	8	Final
Estonia (Koitmäe)	0	0	0	1	0	0	1	X	2
South Korea (Jang)	1	0	2	0	1	1	0	X	5

Sheet D	1	2	3	4	5	6	7	8	Final
China (Wang)	0	2	0	0	3	2	0	X	7
Slovakia (Ďuriš)	1	0	1	1	0	0	2	X	5

=== Draw 13 ===
Wednesday, March 9, 14:35

Sheet A	1	2	3	4	5	6	7	8	Final
Sweden (Petersson-Dahl)	3	0	0	1	0	0	1	0	5
Slovakia (Ďuriš)	0	1	2	0	1	1	0	1	6

Sheet B	1	2	3	4	5	6	7	8	Final
United States (Thums)	1	3	0	0	1	0	0	3	8
Switzerland (Kneubühl)	0	0	2	1	0	1	1	0	5

Sheet C	1	2	3	4	5	6	7	8	Final
Norway (Syversen)	0	0	0	2	0	1	1	0	4
China (Wang)	1	0	1	0	1	0	0	4	7

Sheet D	1	2	3	4	5	6	7	8	Final
Canada (Ideson)	0	0	1	1	0	2	2	X	6
Great Britain (Nibloe)	1	1	0	0	1	0	0	X	3

=== Draw 14 ===
Wednesday, March 9, 19:35

Sheet A	1	2	3	4	5	6	7	8	Final
South Korea (Jang)	3	0	2	0	0	2	0	1	8
Great Britain (Nibloe)	0	1	0	2	1	0	2	0	6

Sheet B	1	2	3	4	5	6	7	8	Final
Estonia (Koitmäe)	0	2	0	1	0	0	0	X	3
Canada (Ideson)	1	0	3	0	1	2	2	X	9

Sheet C	1	2	3	4	5	6	7	8	Final
United States (Thums)	0	2	0	4	0	2	0	0	8
Latvia (Rožkova)	1	0	1	0	3	0	1	1	7

=== Draw 15 ===
Thursday, March 10, 9:35

Sheet A	1	2	3	4	5	6	7	8	Final
Canada (Ideson)	0	1	0	1	0	2	0	3	7
Norway (Syversen)	1	0	1	0	3	0	1	0	6

Sheet B	1	2	3	4	5	6	7	8	Final
China (Wang)	1	0	1	0	2	1	1	X	6
Great Britain (Nibloe)	0	2	0	1	0	0	0	X	3

Sheet C	1	2	3	4	5	6	7	8	Final
Slovakia (Ďuriš)	0	1	0	0	2	0	5	X	8
Switzerland (Kneubühl)	2	0	1	1	0	2	0	X	6

Sheet D	1	2	3	4	5	6	7	8	Final
Sweden (Petersson-Dahl)	0	0	3	2	0	0	5	X	10
United States (Thums)	2	0	0	0	4	1	0	X	7

=== Draw 16 ===
Thursday, March 10, 14:35

Sheet A	1	2	3	4	5	6	7	8	Final
Switzerland (Kneubühl)	1	0	2	0	0	0	2	1	6
Estonia (Koitmäe)	0	1	0	2	2	3	0	0	8

Sheet C	1	2	3	4	5	6	7	8	Final
Great Britain (Nibloe)	1	3	0	3	1	0	0	X	8
Latvia (Briedis)	0	0	1	0	0	1	2	X	4

Sheet D	1	2	3	4	5	6	7	8	Final
South Korea (Jang)	1	0	2	0	2	0	1	0	6
United States (Thums)	0	2	0	1	0	2	0	2	7

=== Draw 17 ===
Thursday, March 10, 19:35

Sheet A	1	2	3	4	5	6	7	8	Final
Latvia (Rožkova)	1	0	0	0	1	0	X	X	2
China (Wang)	0	2	1	3	0	3	X	X	9

Sheet C	1	2	3	4	5	6	7	8	Final
South Korea (Jang)	1	1	1	0	0	5	2	X	10
Sweden (Petersson-Dahl)	0	0	0	1	3	0	0	X	4

Sheet D	1	2	3	4	5	6	7	8	Final
Slovakia (Ďuriš)	1	0	0	1	0	2	1	2	7
Estonia (Koitmäe)	0	1	3	0	2	0	0	0	6

== Playoffs ==
Semifinals
1	China	9
4	Canada	5
2	Slovakia	4
3	Sweden	6

Gold medal game
1	China	8
3	Sweden	3
Bronze medal game
4	Canada	8
2	Slovakia	3

=== Semifinals ===
Friday, March 11, 14:35

Sheet C	1	2	3	4	5	6	7	8	Final
China (Wang)	1	0	3	0	3	2	0	X	9
Canada (Ideson)	0	1	0	2	0	0	2	X	5

Sheet A	1	2	3	4	5	6	7	8	Final
Slovakia (Ďuriš)	0	0	0	3	1	0	0	0	4
Sweden (Petersson-Dahl)	1	1	1	0	0	1	1	1	6

=== Bronze medal game ===
Friday, March 11, 19:35

Sheet B	1	2	3	4	5	6	7	8	Final
Canada (Ideson)	1	1	0	0	1	1	0	4	8
Slovakia (Ďuriš)	0	0	0	2	0	0	1	0	3

=== Gold medal game ===
Saturday, March 12, 14:35

Team	1	2	3	4	5	6	7	8	Final
China (Wang)	0	1	0	0	4	0	3	X	8
Sweden (Petersson-Dahl)	0	0	1	1	0	1	0	X	3

== Final standings ==
The final standings are:

Place	Team
1st place, gold medalist(s)	China
2nd place, silver medalist(s)	Sweden
3rd place, bronze medalist(s)	Canada
4	Slovakia
5	United States
6	South Korea
7	Norway
8	Great Britain
9	Latvia
10	Estonia
11	Switzerland
