= Chrissy Molnar =

Canadian wheelchair curler

- Curler
- Born: Christine Molnar; Trent Lakes, Ontario, Canada

Team
- Curling club: Bobcaygeon Curling Club, Bobcaygeon, ON

Curling career
- Member Association: Canada
- World Wheelchair Championship: 2 (2024, 2025)
Medal record
Wheelchair curling
Representing Canada
World Wheelchair Championship
Silver medal – second place	2024 Gangneung	Mixed team
Bronze medal – third place	2025 Stevenston	Mixed Team

Christine Molnar is a Canadian wheelchair curler.

== Career ==
Molnar was encouraged to try wheelchair curling in 2012. She competed at the Canadian Wheelchair Curling Championships in 2013.

She took a break from curling to have children, but returned to competition post-COVID. Molnar was the alternate for the silver medal winning Canadian team at the 2024 World Wheelchair Championships, alongside Mark Ideson, Gil Dash, Ina Forrest, and Jon Thurston. At the 2025 Wheelchair Curling Ontario Provincial Championship, Molnar won in mixed doubles with teammate Jon Thurston. She will represent Canada at the 2025 World Wheelchair Curling Championships as the team's alternate.

=== Teams ===
Year	Skip	Third	Second	Lead	Alternate	Coach	Events (Result)
2013	Ken Gregory	Collinda Joseph	Jon Thurston	Chrissy Molnar		Carl Rennick	CWhCC 2013 (7th)
2023	Jon Thurston	Collinda Joseph	Karl Allen	Chrissy Molnar			CWhCC 2023 (5th)
2024	Jon Thurston	Ina Forrest	Gil Dash	Mark Ideson	Chrissy Molnar	Kyle Paquette	WWhCC 2024 (silver)
2025	Jon Thurston	Gil Dash	Doug Dean	Collinda Joseph	Chrissy Molnar		WWhCC 2025 (bronze)

== Personal life ==
Molnar became paralyzed after a balcony she was standing on collapsed.
