= Billy Bridges =

- Bridges in 2026
- Born: 22 May 1984 (age 42) Summerside, Prince Edward; Island, Canada
- Height: 5 ft 8 in (173 cm)
- Weight: 185 lb (84 kg; 13 st 3 lb)
- Position: Forward
- Catches: Right
- National team: Canada
- Playing career: 1998–present
Medal record
Para ice hockey
Representing Canada
Paralympic Games
| Gold medal – first place | 2006 Torino | Team |
| Silver medal – second place | 2018 Pyeongchang | Team |
| Silver medal – second place | 2022 Beijing | Team competition |
| Bronze medal – third place | 2014 Sochi | Team |
World Championships
| Gold medal – first place | 2000 Salt Lake City | Team |
| Gold medal – first place | 2008 Marlborough | Team |
| Gold medal – first place | 2013 Goyang | Team |
| Gold medal – first place | 2017 Gangeung | Team |
| Silver medal – second place | 2015 Buffalo | Team |
| Silver medal – second place | 2019 Ostrava | Team |
| Silver medal – second place | 2021 Ostrava | Team |
| Bronze medal – third place | 2009 Ostrava | Team |
| Bronze medal – third place | 2012 Hamar | Team |

Billy Bridges (born 22 March 1984) is a Canadian ice sledge hockey, wheelchair basketball, and wheelchair curling player. Born in Summerside, he has spina bifida. On July 1, 2011, Bridges married former Olympic women's ice hockey player Sami Jo Small. He competed at the 2022 Winter Paralympics, in Para ice hockey winning a silver medal.

== Life ==
He began playing ice sledge hockey in 1997, aged 12, for the Kitchener Sidewinders. Aged 14, he was selected for Canada's national team, the youngest player ever to be picked. He has World Championship golds from 2000, 2008, 2013 and 2017 and Paralympic gold from 2006, where he was picked for the All-Star Team.

As well as ice sledge hockey, he has a career as a wheelchair basketball player, including seven Canadian titles with Team Ontario. In 2001, he also competed at the Junior World Championships, and in 2005 was selected as the team's most valuable player (MVP). Bridges was also the skip of Team Manitoba at the 2026 Canadian Wheelchair Curling Championship, finishing in 10th place with a 2–6 record.

He completed at the 2019 World Para Ice Hockey Championships, and 2021 World Para Ice Hockey Championships, winning silver medals.

== Honours ==
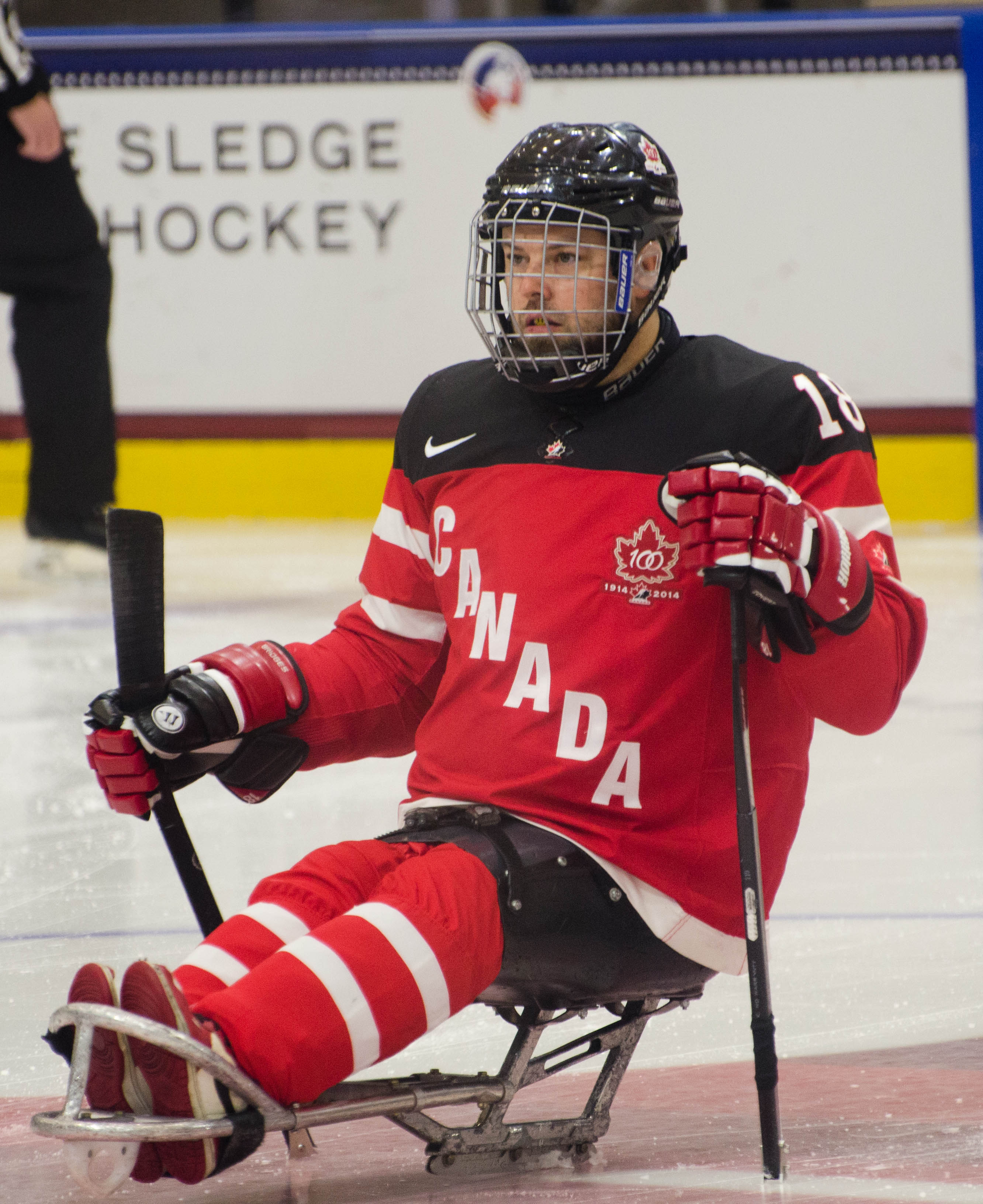
Bridges in 2015

- 2010 Winter Paralympics
  - 4th place in ice sledge hockey
- 2009 IPC Ice Sledge Hockey World Championships
  - Bronze
- 2008 IPC Ice Sledge Hockey World Championships
  - Gold
- 2006 Winter Paralympics
  - Gold in ice sledge hockey
- 2004 IPC Ice Sledge Hockey World Championships
  - 4th place
- 2002 Winter Paralympics
  - 4th place
- 2000 IPC Ice Sledge Hockey World Championships
  - Gold (2–1 against Norway)

== Career stats ==
=== Hockey Canada ===
| Year | Event | GP | G | A | PTS | PIM |
| 2007 | World Sledge Hockey championships | 4 | 2 | 5 | 7 | 10 |
| 2008 | World Sledge Hockey championships | 4 | 4 | 5 | 9 | 0 |
| 2009 | World Sledge Hockey championships | 4 | 2 | 5 | 7 | 6 |
