= Rich Green =

American politician

Member-elect of the New Hampshire House of Representatives from the Hillsborough 9th district
- Assuming office December 2026
- Succeeding: William Dolan

Personal details
- Party: Democratic

Rich Green is an American politician. A member of the Democratic Party, he is the member-elect for the Hillsborough 9th district of the New Hampshire House of Representatives.
