= Carl Marquis =

Canadian Paralympic athlete

Medal record

Paralympic athletics

Representing Canada

Paralympic Games
Bronze medal – third place	1996 Atlanta	4x400 m relay - T52-53

Carl Marquis is a paralympic athlete from Canada, competing in category T54 wheelchair racing events in 1996, 2000, and 2004. After retiring from track and field, Marquis now competes in wheelchair curling.

Marquis competed in the 100m, 800m and 1500m in the 1996 Summer Paralympics but it was not until he teamed him with his fellow Canadians in the T52-53 4 × 400 m relay that he won a medal, a bronze. This would prove to be his only medal despite competing in a total of seven events over the 2000 and 2004 Summer Paralympics he would fail to win another medal.

Marquis would return to competitive sports in 2011, now in wheelchair curling, where he would compete for Quebec at the Canadian Wheelchair Curling Championship. Marquis has won two Canadian championship titles, in 2013 and 2026.
