= James Anseeuw =

Canadian wheelchair curler and Paralympic medalist

- Curler
- Born: September 16, 1959 (age 67); Oak Bluff, Manitoba, Canada

Curling career
- Paralympic: 1 (2018)
Medal record
Wheelchair curling
Representing Canada
Paralympic Games
Bronze medal – third place	2018 PyeongChang	Mixed team

James Anseeuw (born September 16, 1959) is a Canadian Wheelchair curler. As the oldest Canadian Paralympic athlete, he helped Canada win a bronze medal at the 2018 Winter Paralympics in South Korea.

== Early life ==
Anseeuw was born on September 16, 1959, in Oak Bluff, Manitoba, Canada.

== Career ==
In the 1990s, Anseeuw was a semi-professional snowmobile racer until he became paralyzed after a crash on March 27, 1999. At the time of the accident, Anseeuw was team manager for the Flying Canucks and Arctic Cat's Canadian Racing Coordinator. Arctic Cat began a trust fund in his name, and mentee Blair Morgan began raising money for spinal cord research.

In 2014, Anseeuw was convinced to try wheelchair curling by Dennis Thiessen. He trained with the Assiniboine Curling Club and competed with Team Manitoba at the 2014 Canadian Wheelchair Curling Championship, where they finished in first place. Three years later, he again won gold with Team Manitoba at the 2017 Canadian Wheelchair Curling Championship.

At the age of 58, Anseeuw was the oldest athlete selected to compete for Team Canada at the 2018 Winter Paralympics in South Korea. The Canadian wheelchair curling team was eliminated in the semi-finals, which earned them a bronze medal.
