= Chen Jianxin (curler) =

Chinese wheelchair curler and Paralympic gold medalist

- Curler ♂
- Born: 15 June 1992 (age 34); Jiuxian, Beijing, China

Curling career
- World Wheelchair Championship: 4 (2017, 2020, 2021, 2025)
- Paralympic: 3 (2018, 2022, 2026)
Medal record
Wheelchair curling
Representing China
Paralympic Games
Gold medal – first place	2018 PyeongChang	Mixed team
Gold medal – first place	2022 Beijing	Mixed team
Silver medal – second place	2026 Milano Cortina	Mixed team
World Championship
Gold medal – first place	2021 Beijing	Mixed Team
Gold medal – first place	2025 Stevenston	Mixed Team

Chen Jianxin (Chinese: 陈建新; pinyin: Chén Jiànxīn, born 15 June 1992 in Jiuxian, Beijing) is a Chinese wheelchair curling player. He participated at the 2018 Winter Paralympics and 2022 Winter Paralympics, and won a gold medal at both games.

== Career ==
His legs were amputated in 2010 following a motorcycle accident.
