= Darryl Neighbour =

Canadian wheelchair curler (1948–2026)

Darryl Neighbour (July 21, 1948 – August 11, 2026) was a Canadian wheelchair curler. He was the third for the team that won gold at the 2009 World Championships and was selected as the third for Team Canada in the 2010 Winter Paralympics. He has been paraplegic since 2000.

Neighbour died on August 11, 2026, at the age of 78, after being struck by a driver while crossing a road in Richmond, British Columbia.

== Results ==
Paralympic Games
World Wheelchair Curling Championships
Finish	Event	Year	Place
4.	Wheelchair curling	2008	Switzerland Sursee
Gold	Wheelchair curling	2009	Canada Vancouver
Gold	Wheelchair Curling	2011	Czech Republic Prague
