= Ina Forrest =

Canadian wheelchair curler

- Curler
- Born: 25 May 1962 (age 64); Fort St. John, British Columbia, Canada

Curling career
- Paralympic: 5 (2010, 2014, 2018, 2022, 2026)
Medal record
Wheelchair curling
Representing Canada
Paralympic Games
Gold medal – first place	2010 Vancouver	Mixed team
Gold medal – first place	2014 Sochi	Mixed team
Gold medal – first place	2026 Milano Cortina	Mixed team
Bronze medal – third place	2018 PyeongChang	Mixed team
Bronze medal – third place	2022 Beijing	Mixed team
World Championships
Gold medal – first place	2009 Vancouver	Mixed team
Gold medal – first place	2011 Prague	Mixed team
Gold medal – first place	2013 Sochi	Mixed team
Silver medal – second place	2020 Wetzikon	Mixed team
Silver medal – second place	2023 Richmond	Mixed team
Silver medal – second place	2024 Gangneung	Mixed Team

Ina Forrest (born 25 May 1962) is a wheelchair curler from Spallumcheen, British Columbia. She was selected to be second for Canada's team (Note: The team is mixed gender, as mandated by the World Curling Federation's rules for wheelchair curling.) at the 2010 and 2014 Winter Paralympics, winning a gold medal on both occasions. She has also won a gold medal 3 times in the World Wheelchair Curling Championships, in 2009, 2011, and 2013. She was inducted into the Canadian Curling Hall of Fame in February 2016. She is a member of the Vernon Curling Club in Vernon, British Columbia.

== Early curling career ==
Forrest was born in Fort St. John, British Columbia. She started wheelchair curling in 2004, and won silver in both the 2004 and 2005 Canadian National Wheelchair Curling Championships as a member of the British Columbia wheelchair curling team, before being named in 2006 to the Canadian Wheelchair Curling Team for whom she has since competed, as of 2018, in the next 14 World Wheelchair Curling Championships (starting in 2007) and the next 5 Winter Paralympics (starting in 2010).

== Results ==
Winter Paralympics
Gold	Wheelchair curling	2010	Vancouver, Canada
Gold	Wheelchair curling	2014	Sochi, Russia
Bronze	Wheelchair curling	2018	Pyeongchang, South Korea
Bronze	Wheelchair curling	2022	Beijing, China
Gold	Wheelchair curling	2026	Milan, Italy

World Wheelchair Curling Championships
Finish	Event	Year	Place
4	Wheelchair curling	2007	Sollefteå, Sweden
4	Wheelchair curling	2008	Sursee, Switzerland
Gold	Wheelchair curling	2009	Vancouver, Canada
Gold	Wheelchair curling	2011	Prague, Czech Republic
7	Wheelchair curling	2012	Chuncheon, South Korea
Gold	Wheelchair curling	2013	Sochi, Russia
6	Wheelchair curling	2015	Lohja, Finland
7	Wheelchair curling	2016	Lucerne, Switzerland
5	Wheelchair curling	2017	Pyeongchang, South Korea
10	Wheelchair curling	2019	Stirling, Scotland
Silver	Wheelchair curling	2020	Wetzikon, Switzerland
5	Wheelchair curling	2021	Beijing, China
Silver	Wheelchair curling	2023	Richmond, Canada
Silver	Wheelchair curling	2024	Gangneung, South Korea

== Family ==
She and her husband Curtis are small business owners. They have three children: Evany, Marlon and Connor.
