= Marie Wright (curler) =

Canadian wheelchair curler (born 1960)

- Curler
- Born: May 9, 1960 (age 66); Oxbow, Saskatchewan, Canada

Curling career
- Member Association: Canada
- World Wheelchair Championship: 4 (2015, 2017, 2019, 2023)
- World Wheelchair Mixed Doubles Championship: 1 (2022)
- Paralympic: 1 (2018)
Medal record
Wheelchair curling
Representing Canada
Paralympic Games
Bronze medal – third place	2018 PyeongChang	Mixed team
World Wheelchair Championship
Silver medal – second place	2023 Richmond	Mixed Team

Marie Wright (born May 9, 1960) is a Canadian wheelchair curler. Wright helped Canada win a bronze medal at the 2018 Winter Paralympics in South Korea in 2018.

== Early life ==
Wright was born on May 9, 1960, in Moose Jaw, Saskatchewan. On August 20, 1988, Wright, two of her daughters, and her niece and nephew were in a car accident. She was left paraplegic and one of her daughters had a serious head injury. Her husband left her two years later and she raised her four daughters on her own.

== Career ==
Wright began para-curling in 2008 and played for Team Saskatchewan at their first Canadian Wheelchair Curling Championship. Within two years, she achieved her Level 1 Officiation certification and volunteered at the 2010 Saskatchewan Winter Games curling competition as a timer. During the 2012 Canadian Wheelchair Curling Championship, Wright helped Team Saskatchewan win their first national wheelchair title.

Wright competed with Team Saskatchewan at the 2016 Canadian Wheelchair Curling Championship and 2017 Canadian Wheelchair Curling Championship. On December 8, 2017, Wright was named to Team Canada's roster for the 2018 Winter Paralympics. She helped Canada take home a bronze medal in a win over South Korea on March 17, 2018. Later that year, Wright became the first female skip to win a national wheelchair title as Team Saskatchewan went 11–0 to win the 2018 Canadian Wheelchair Curling Championship. During the summer, Wright coached an all-girls softball team within the Moose Jaw Minor Girls Fastball League.

On January 16, 2019, Wright was again named to Team Saskatchewan's roster for the 2019 Wheelchair Curling World Championships, where the team finished fifth.
