= Dennis Thiessen =

Canadian wheelchair curler (born 1961)

- Curler
- Born: April 20, 1961 (age 65); Crystal City, Manitoba, Canada

Curling career
- Paralympic: 3 (2014, 2018, 2022)
Medal record
Wheelchair curling
Representing Canada
Paralympic Games
| Gold medal – first place | 2014 Sochi | Mixed team |
| Bronze medal – third place | 2018 PyeongChang | Mixed team |
| Bronze medal – third place | 2022 Beijing | Mixed team |
World Championships
| Gold medal – first place | 2013 Sochi | Mixed team |
| Silver medal – second place | 2020 Wetzikon | Mixed team |
World Mixed Doubles Championship
| Bronze medal – third place | 2023 Richmond |

Dennis Thiessen (born April 20, 1961, in Crystal City, Manitoba) is a Canadian wheelchair curler who was part of the winning team in wheelchair curling for Canada at the 2014 Winter Paralympics. He played on the winning Canadian team at the 2013 World Wheelchair Curling Championship. He had his leg amputated following a farm accident at age seventeen. He is the only Manitoban on the team and lives in Sanford, Manitoba.

He was inducted into the Canadian Curling Hall of Fame in 2019.

== Personal ==
Thiessen was born in Crystal City, Manitoba on April 20, 1961, and now resides in Sanford, Manitoba. He is married and has 2 children. In 1978, when Thiessen was 17 years old, he had an accident in his family's farm and had lost his leg. He was suggested to give wheelchair curling a try in 2005. He said that he was really inspired by another Manitoban winter sportsperson Cindy Klassen and that she was "the ultimate professional and a great representative of Canada". He had also started the organization "Manitoba Farmers with Disabilities".

== Career ==
=== Sochi 2014 ===
At the age of 52, Thiessen has competed in his first Paralympic Games, he made the tryout two years before in 2012. After seeing the team, he said that "It was just an unbelievable feeling," Canada won the spot at the top of the podium by beating Russia 8–3. "It was an emotional high" explained Thiessen who has just won his first Paralympic Medal.
