= 2023 World Wheelchair Curling Championship =

- Host city: Richmond, British Columbia, Canada
- Arena: Richmond Curling Centre
- Dates: March 4–12
- Winner: China
- Skip: Wang Haitao
- Third: Zhang Shuaiyu
- Second: Yang Jinqiao
- Lead: Li Nana
- Alternate: Zhang Mingliang
- Coach: Li Jianrui, Yue Qingshuang
- Finalist: Canada (Ideson)

The 2023 World Wheelchair Curling Championship was held from March 4 to 12 at the Richmond Curling Centre in Richmond, British Columbia, Canada. The event was held in conjunction with the 2023 World Wheelchair Mixed Doubles Curling Championship.

== Qualification ==
The following nations qualified to participate in the 2023 World Wheelchair Curling Championship:

Event	Vacancies	Qualified
Host nation	1	Canada
2021 World Wheelchair Curling Championship	7	China; Sweden; United States; Scotland; Norway; Latvia; South Korea
2022 World Wheelchair-B Curling Championship	3	Czech Republic; Denmark; ~~Germany~~; Japan
Emergency Ruling Replacement	1	Italy
TOTAL	12	

== Teams ==
The teams are listed as follows:

Canada	China	Czech Republic	Denmark
Fourth: Jon Thurston; Third: Ina Forrest; Second: Gil Dash; Skip: Mark Ideson; Alternate: Marie Wright	Skip: Wang Haitao; Third: Zhang Shuaiyu; Second: Yang Jinqiao; Lead: Li Nana; Alternate: Zhang Mingliang	Skip: Dana Selnekovičová; Third: Martin Tluk; Second: Milan Bartůněk; Lead: Radek Musílek	Skip: Kenneth Ørbæk; Third: Michaell Jensen; Second: Niels Nielsen; Lead: Sussie Nielsen
Italy	Japan	Latvia	Norway
Skip: Egidio Marchese; Third: Fabrizio Bich; Second: Sergio de Florian; Lead: Orietta Berto; Alternate: Angela Menardi	Skip: Takashi Sakataya; Third: Kazuhiro Kashiwabara; Second: Hiromi Takahashi; Lead: Kana Matsuda; Alternate: Yoku Akazawa	Fourth: Sergejs Djačenko; Third: Agris Lasmans; Skip: Ojārs Briedis; Lead: Ieva Melle; Alternate: Linda Meijere	Skip: Jostein Stordahl; Third: Ole Fredrik Syversen; Second: Geir Arne Skogstad; Lead: Mia Larsen Sveberg; Alternate: Ingrid Djupskaas
Scotland	South Korea	Sweden	United States
Fourth: Gregor Ewan; Skip: Hugh Nibloe; Second: Gary Logan; Lead: Joanna Butterfield; Alternate: Meggan Dawson-Farrell	Skip: Lee Hyeon-chul; Third: Yang Hui-tae; Second: Jang Jae-hyuk; Lead: Cho Eun-geon; Alternate: Min Yeong-nam	Skip: Viljo Petersson-Dahl; Third: Ronny Persson; Second: Sabina Johansson; Lead: Johanna Glennert; Alternate: Aasa Lie	Fourth: Matthew Thums; Skip: Stephen Emt; Second: Shawn Sadowski; Lead: Laura Dwyer; Alternate: Batoyun Uranchimeg

== Round robin standings ==
Final Round Robin Standings

Key
Teams to Playoffs
Teams relegated to 2024 B Championship

Country	Skip	W	L	W–L	PF	PA	EW	EL	BE	SE	DSC
China	Wang Haitao	10	1	–	75	28	43	25	6	18	105.20
Canada	Mark Ideson	9	2	–	79	43	43	31	1	19	97.25
South Korea	Lee Hyeon-chul	8	3	–	72	47	42	37	3	15	98.78
United States	Stephen Emt	7	4	–	64	60	38	39	2	14	121.25
Sweden	Viljo Petersson-Dahl	6	5	–	65	62	34	38	2	12	127.17
Scotland	Hugh Nibloe	5	6	2–0	57	60	39	38	1	17	141.94
Norway	Jostein Stordahl	5	6	1–1	63	63	40	36	4	16	105.74
Czech Republic	Dana Selnekovičová	5	6	0–2	61	67	40	38	1	11	141.99
Latvia	Ojārs Briedis	4	7	–	50	73	37	43	0	13	160.00
Italy	Egidio Marchese	3	8	–	71	85	39	41	2	16	164.13
Denmark	Kenneth Ørbæk	2	9	1–0	47	90	30	46	1	9	119.66
Japan	Takashi Sakataya	2	9	0–1	51	77	33	46	3	9	124.23

Round Robin Summary Table
Pos.	Country	Canada	China	Czech Republic	Denmark	Italy	Japan	Latvia	Norway	Scotland	South Korea	Sweden	United States	Record
2	Canada	—	4–8	8–2	7–3	6–4	7–4	7–6	10–3	8–1	3–7	13–1	6–4	9–2
1	China	8–4	—	7–2	11–2	6–2	7–2	4–3	5–1	9–2	4–7	8–2	6–1	10–1
8	Czech Republic	2–8	2–7	—	11–6	10–6	3–7	5–2	5–9	3–9	6–3	4–7	10–3	5–6
11	Denmark	3–7	2–11	6–11	—	2–7	10–5	6–7	1–9	L–W	1–13	8–7	4–7	2–9
10	Italy	4–6	2–6	6–10	7–2	—	9–10	4–8	15–4	9–6	4–10	3–12	8–11	3–8
12	Japan	4–7	2–7	7–3	5–10	10–9	—	7–8	2–7	2–6	4–6	4–7	4–7	2–9
9	Latvia	6–7	3–4	2–5	7–6	8–4	8–7	—	2–11	6–3	4–6	1–13	3–7	4–7
7	Norway	3–10	1–5	9–5	9–1	4–15	7–2	11–2	—	5–6	6–7	1–5	7–5	5–6
6	Scotland	1–8	2–9	9–3	W–L	6–9	6–2	3–6	6–5	—	4–6	10–1	4–7	5–6
3	South Korea	7–3	7–4	3–6	13–1	10–4	6–4	6–4	7–6	6–4	—	3–6	4–5	8–3
5	Sweden	1–13	2–8	7–4	7–8	12–3	7–4	13–1	5–1	1–10	6–3	—	4–7	6–5
4	United States	4–6	1–6	3–10	7–4	11–8	7–4	7–3	5–7	7–4	5–4	7–4	—	7–4

== Round robin results ==
All draws times are listed in Pacific Time (UTC−08:00).

=== Draw 1 ===
Saturday, March 4, 12:00 pm

Sheet A	1	2	3	4	5	6	7	8	Final
Sweden (Petersson-Dahl)	0	2	0	0	0	1	0	4	7
Denmark (Ørbæk) 🔨	1	0	1	2	2	0	2	0	8

Sheet C	1	2	3	4	5	6	7	8	Final
Norway (Stordahl) 🔨	1	1	2	1	0	1	1	0	7
United States (Emt)	0	0	0	0	3	0	0	2	5

Sheet E	1	2	3	4	5	6	7	8	EE	Final
Canada (Ideson)	0	0	1	0	0	1	1	1	0	4
China (Wang) 🔨	0	1	0	2	1	0	0	0	4	8

Sheet B	1	2	3	4	5	6	7	8	Final
South Korea (Lee) 🔨	2	1	0	0	0	0	2	1	6
Scotland (Nibloe)	0	0	1	1	1	1	0	0	4

Sheet D	1	2	3	4	5	6	7	8	Final
Japan (Sakataya) 🔨	1	0	2	2	0	2	0	X	7
Czech Republic (Selnekovičová)	0	1	0	0	1	0	1	X	3

Sheet F	1	2	3	4	5	6	7	8	Final
Latvia (Briedis) 🔨	1	2	1	2	0	0	0	2	8
Italy (Marchese)	0	0	0	0	1	1	2	0	4

=== Draw 2 ===
Saturday, March 4, 7:00 pm

Sheet A	1	2	3	4	5	6	7	8	Final
United States (Emt) 🔨	1	0	0	1	0	2	0	3	7
Scotland (Nibloe)	0	1	0	0	2	0	1	0	4

Sheet C	1	2	3	4	5	6	7	8	EE	Final
Italy (Marchese)	0	0	5	0	2	0	1	1	0	9
Japan (Sakataya) 🔨	2	1	0	3	0	3	0	0	1	10

Sheet E	1	2	3	4	5	6	7	8	Final
Denmark (Ørbæk)	0	1	0	0	0	0	X	X	1
Norway (Stordahl) 🔨	2	0	2	1	3	1	X	X	9

Sheet B	1	2	3	4	5	6	7	8	Final
China (Wang) 🔨	1	1	0	2	0	0	4	X	8
Sweden (Petersson-Dahl)	0	0	0	0	1	1	0	X	2

Sheet D	1	2	3	4	5	6	7	8	Final
South Korea (Lee)	0	0	1	0	2	2	0	1	6
Latvia (Briedis) 🔨	1	1	0	1	0	0	1	0	4

Sheet F	1	2	3	4	5	6	7	8	Final
Canada (Ideson) 🔨	3	0	1	3	1	0	X	X	8
Czech Republic (Selnekovičová)	0	1	0	0	0	1	X	X	2

=== Draw 3 ===
Sunday, March 5, 12:00 pm

Sheet A	1	2	3	4	5	6	7	8	9	10	Final
Latvia (Briedis)	0	1	0	1	0	0	0	1	0	0	3
China (Wang) 🔨	1	0	1	0	0	0	1	0	0	1	4

Sheet C	1	2	3	4	5	6	7	8	Final
Scotland (Nibloe)	0	3	2	1	3	1	X	X	10
Sweden (Petersson-Dahl) 🔨	1	0	0	0	0	0	X	X	1

Sheet E	1	2	3	4	5	6	7	8	Final
Czech Republic (Selnekovičová) 🔨	2	0	2	0	1	0	1	X	6
South Korea (Lee)	0	1	0	1	0	1	0	X	3

Sheet B	1	2	3	4	5	6	7	8	Final
Italy (Marchese)	2	1	0	1	2	0	1	X	7
Denmark (Ørbæk) 🔨	0	0	1	0	0	1	0	X	2

Sheet D	1	2	3	4	5	6	7	8	Final
United States (Emt) 🔨	0	1	0	0	1	1	0	1	4
Canada (Ideson)	2	0	0	2	0	0	2	0	6

Sheet F	1	2	3	4	5	6	7	8	Final
Norway (Stordahl) 🔨	1	1	3	0	1	0	1	X	7
Japan (Sakataya)	0	0	0	0	0	2	0	X	2

=== Draw 4 ===
Sunday, March 5, 7:00 pm

Sheet A	1	2	3	4	5	6	7	8	Final
South Korea (Lee) 🔨	1	0	0	4	0	2	3	X	10
Italy (Marchese)	0	1	2	0	1	0	0	X	4

Sheet C	1	2	3	4	5	6	7	8	Final
Czech Republic (Selnekovičová)	0	0	0	0	1	0	1	X	2
China (Wang) 🔨	1	1	1	1	0	3	0	X	7

Sheet E	1	2	3	4	5	6	7	8	Final
Japan (Sakataya)	1	1	2	0	0	0	0	X	4
United States (Emt) 🔨	0	0	0	2	2	2	1	X	7

Sheet B	1	2	3	4	5	6	7	8	Final
Canada (Ideson) 🔨	2	1	0	3	0	1	0	0	7
Latvia (Briedis)	0	0	2	0	1	0	2	1	6

Sheet D	1	2	3	4	5	6	7	8	Final
Sweden (Petersson-Dahl)	0	1	2	0	0	1	1	X	5
Norway (Stordahl) 🔨	0	0	0	0	1	0	0	X	1

Sheet F	1	2	3	4	5	6	7	8	Final
Denmark (Ørbæk)	2	0	0	1	0	1	0	/	L^
Scotland (Nibloe) 🔨	0	1	1	0	1	0	3		W

^Denmark ran out of time, and therefore forfeited the match.

=== Draw 5 ===
Monday, March 6, 12:30 pm

Sheet A	1	2	3	4	5	6	7	8	Final
Canada (Ideson) 🔨	2	0	0	3	0	2	0	X	7
Japan (Sakataya)	0	0	1	0	1	0	2	X	4

Sheet C	1	2	3	4	5	6	7	8	Final
South Korea (Lee) 🔨	0	4	1	4	1	3	X	X	13
Denmark (Ørbæk)	1	0	0	0	0	0	X	X	1

Sheet E	1	2	3	4	5	6	7	8	Final
Scotland (Nibloe) 🔨	1	0	0	0	0	1	1	X	3
Latvia (Briedis)	0	1	2	1	2	0	0	X	6

Sheet B	1	2	3	4	5	6	7	8	EE	Final
Czech Republic (Selnekovičová)	0	1	0	1	0	1	1	1	0	5
Norway (Stordahl) 🔨	1	0	1	0	3	0	0	0	4	9

Sheet D	1	2	3	4	5	6	7	8	Final
Italy (Marchese)	1	1	0	0	0	0	0	X	2
China (Wang) 🔨	0	0	3	1	0	0	2	X	6

Sheet F	1	2	3	4	5	6	7	8	Final
Sweden (Petersson-Dahl)	0	2	0	0	0	0	2	0	4
United States (Emt) 🔨	3	0	1	0	1	1	0	1	7

=== Draw 6 ===
Monday, March 6, 8:00 pm

Sheet A	1	2	3	4	5	6	7	8	Final
Scotland (Nibloe)	1	0	0	3	0	4	1	X	9
Czech Republic (Selnekovičová) 🔨	0	1	1	0	1	0	0	X	3

Sheet C	1	2	3	4	5	6	7	8	Final
United States (Emt)	3	0	1	0	2	0	5	0	11
Italy (Marchese) 🔨	0	3	0	1	0	3	0	1	8

Sheet E	1	2	3	4	5	6	7	8	Final
Norway (Stordahl)	0	1	1	0	1	0	0	X	3
Canada (Ideson) 🔨	2	0	0	2	0	3	3	X	10

Sheet B	1	2	3	4	5	6	7	8	Final
Sweden (Petersson-Dahl) 🔨	3	1	0	1	0	2	0	X	7
Japan (Sakataya)	0	0	1	0	2	0	1	X	4

Sheet D	1	2	3	4	5	6	7	8	Final
Latvia (Briedis)	0	1	2	0	0	2	2	0	7
Denmark (Ørbæk) 🔨	2	0	0	2	1	0	0	1	6

Sheet F	1	2	3	4	5	6	7	8	Final
China (Wang)	0	0	0	1	1	0	2	0	4
South Korea (Lee) 🔨	3	1	0	0	0	1	0	2	7

=== Draw 7 ===
Tuesday, March 7, 12:30 pm

Sheet A	1	2	3	4	5	6	7	8	Final
Norway (Stordahl) 🔨	4	0	4	0	2	1	X	X	11
Latvia (Briedis)	0	1	0	1	0	0	X	X	2

Sheet C	1	2	3	4	5	6	7	8	Final
Japan (Sakataya)	0	0	0	0	0	1	1	0	2
Scotland (Nibloe) 🔨	1	1	1	1	1	0	0	1	6

Sheet E	1	2	3	4	5	6	7	8	Final
South Korea (Lee)	0	0	0	1	1	1	0	0	3
Sweden (Petersson-Dahl) 🔨	2	1	0	0	0	0	1	2	6

Sheet B	1	2	3	4	5	6	7	8	Final
Denmark (Ørbæk) 🔨	1	0	0	0	1	0	X	X	2
China (Wang)	0	4	3	2	0	2	X	X	11

Sheet D	1	2	3	4	5	6	7	8	Final
Czech Republic (Selnekovičová) 🔨	5	1	0	0	2	2	X	X	10
United States (Emt)	0	0	2	1	0	0	X	X	3

Sheet F	1	2	3	4	5	6	7	8	Final
Italy (Marchese)	0	0	2	0	0	1	1	X	4
Canada (Ideson) 🔨	1	1	0	3	1	0	0	X	6

=== Draw 8 ===
Tuesday, March 7, 8:00 pm

Sheet A	1	2	3	4	5	6	7	8	Final
China (Wang)	1	1	0	2	1	1	X	X	6
United States (Emt) 🔨	0	0	1	0	0	0	X	X	1

Sheet C	1	2	3	4	5	6	7	8	Final
Sweden (Petersson-Dahl) 🔨	3	1	4	3	2	0	X	X	13
Latvia (Briedis)	0	0	0	0	0	1	X	X	1

Sheet E	1	2	3	4	5	6	7	8	Final
Italy (Marchese)	2	0	0	1	0	3	0	0	6
Czech Republic (Selnekovičová) 🔨	0	2	2	0	4	0	1	1	10

Sheet B	1	2	3	4	5	6	7	8	Final
Scotland (Nibloe)	0	0	0	1	0	0	X	X	1
Canada (Ideson) 🔨	1	2	3	0	1	1	X	X	8

Sheet D	1	2	3	4	5	6	7	8	EE	Final
Norway (Stordahl) 🔨	1	0	2	0	1	1	1	0	0	6
South Korea (Lee)	0	2	0	1	0	0	0	3	1	7

Sheet F	1	2	3	4	5	6	7	8	Final
Japan (Sakataya)	0	1	1	0	0	3	0	X	5
Denmark (Ørbæk) 🔨	4	0	0	2	2	0	2	X	10

=== Draw 9 ===
Wednesday, March 8, 12:30 pm

Sheet A	1	2	3	4	5	6	7	8	Final
Italy (Marchese)	0	0	2	0	1	0	X	X	3
Sweden (Petersson-Dahl) 🔨	4	3	0	2	0	3	X	X	12

Sheet C	1	2	3	4	5	6	7	8	Final
Canada (Ideson)	0	2	0	1	0	0	0	X	3
South Korea (Lee) 🔨	2	0	0	0	2	2	1	X	7

Sheet E	1	2	3	4	5	6	7	8	Final
United States (Emt)	1	1	2	3	0	0	0	X	7
Denmark (Ørbæk) 🔨	0	0	0	0	2	1	1	X	4

Sheet B	1	2	3	4	5	6	7	8	Final
Latvia (Briedis)	0	0	0	1	0	0	1	X	2
Czech Republic (Selnekovičová) 🔨	0	1	2	0	1	1	0	X	5

Sheet D	1	2	3	4	5	6	7	8	Final
China (Wang) 🔨	2	0	1	0	1	0	3	X	7
Japan (Sakataya)	0	0	0	1	0	1	0	X	2

Sheet F	1	2	3	4	5	6	7	8	Final
Scotland (Nibloe)	1	0	0	3	1	0	0	1	6
Norway (Stordahl) 🔨	0	1	2	0	0	1	1	0	5

=== Draw 10 ===
Wednesday, March 8, 8:00 pm

Sheet A	1	2	3	4	5	6	7	8	Final
Japan (Sakataya)	0	0	2	0	1	0	1	0	4
South Korea (Lee) 🔨	1	1	0	2	0	0	0	2	6

Sheet C	1	2	3	4	5	6	7	8	Final
Denmark (Ørbæk)	0	0	4	1	0	1	0	X	6
Czech Republic (Selnekovičová) 🔨	3	3	0	0	1	0	4	X	11

Sheet E	1	2	3	4	5	6	7	8	Final
China (Wang) 🔨	3	0	0	1	0	0	5	X	9
Scotland (Nibloe)	0	1	0	0	0	1	0	X	2

Sheet B	1	2	3	4	5	6	7	8	Final
Norway (Stordahl) 🔨	2	0	0	0	2	0	0	X	4
Italy (Marchese)	0	1	2	2	0	3	7	X	15

Sheet D	1	2	3	4	5	6	7	8	Final
Canada (Ideson) 🔨	2	3	2	1	0	5	X	X	13
Sweden (Petersson-Dahl)	0	0	0	0	1	0	X	X	1

Sheet F	1	2	3	4	5	6	7	8	Final
United States (Emt) 🔨	0	2	0	2	0	2	1	X	7
Latvia (Briedis)	1	0	1	0	1	0	0	X	3

=== Draw 11 ===
Thursday, March 9, 1:00 pm

Sheet A	1	2	3	4	5	6	7	8	Final
Denmark (Ørbæk) 🔨	1	0	0	0	0	2	0	0	3
Canada (Ideson)	0	2	0	2	1	0	1	1	7

Sheet C	1	2	3	4	5	6	7	8	Final
China (Wang) 🔨	1	0	0	1	0	2	1	X	5
Norway (Stordahl)	0	0	0	0	1	0	0	X	1

Sheet E	1	2	3	4	5	6	7	8	EE	Final
Latvia (Briedis)	0	1	2	1	0	3	0	0	1	8
Japan (Sakataya) 🔨	1	0	0	0	2	0	2	2	0	7

Sheet B	1	2	3	4	5	6	7	8	Final
United States (Emt)	0	0	1	2	0	1	0	1	5
South Korea (Lee) 🔨	1	0	0	0	2	0	1	0	4

Sheet D	1	2	3	4	5	6	7	8	Final
Scotland (Nibloe) 🔨	0	2	0	0	1	0	3	0	6
Italy (Marchese)	3	0	1	2	0	1	0	2	9

Sheet F	1	2	3	4	5	6	7	8	Final
Czech Republic (Selnekovičová)	0	1	1	0	1	0	1	0	4
Sweden (Petersson-Dahl) 🔨	2	0	0	2	0	1	0	2	7

== Playoffs ==
Qualification games
4	United States	3
5	Sweden	11
3	South Korea	2
6	Scotland	6

Semifinals
1	China	5
5	Sweden	2
2	Canada	5
6	Scotland	2

Final
1	China	5
2	Canada	2
Bronze medal game
5	Sweden	4
6	Scotland	7

=== Qualification Games ===
Friday, March 10, 1:00 pm

Sheet C	1	2	3	4	5	6	7	8	Final
South Korea (Lee) 🔨	1	0	1	0	0	0	0	X	2
Scotland (Nibloe)	0	1	0	1	1	1	2	X	6

Sheet E	1	2	3	4	5	6	7	8	Final
United States (Emt) 🔨	0	0	0	2	0	1	X	X	3
Sweden (Petersson-Dahl)	5	1	1	0	4	0	X	X	11

=== Semifinals ===
Saturday, March 11, 2:00 pm

Sheet C	1	2	3	4	5	6	7	8	Final
China (Wang) 🔨	1	0	0	0	1	0	0	3	5
Sweden (Petersson-Dahl)	0	0	0	1	0	0	1	0	2

Sheet E	1	2	3	4	5	6	7	8	Final
Canada (Ideson) 🔨	0	0	1	0	2	2	0	X	5
Scotland (Nibloe)	0	0	0	1	0	0	1	X	2

=== Bronze medal game ===
Sunday, March 12, 10:00 am

Sheet D	1	2	3	4	5	6	7	8	Final
Sweden (Petersson-Dahl) 🔨	2	1	0	0	1	0	0	X	4
Scotland (Nibloe)	0	0	3	1	0	1	2	X	7

=== Final ===
Sunday, March 12, 10:00 am

Sheet B	1	2	3	4	5	6	7	8	Final
China (Wang) 🔨	1	0	0	1	0	1	0	2	5
Canada (Ideson)	0	0	1	0	1	0	0	0	2

== Final standings ==
Key
Teams relegated to 2024 B Championship

Place	Team
1st place, gold medalist(s)	China
2nd place, silver medalist(s)	Canada
3rd place, bronze medalist(s)	Scotland
4	Sweden
5	South Korea
6	United States
7	Norway
8	Czech Republic
9	Latvia
10	Italy
11	Denmark
12	Japan

== See also ==
- 2022 World Wheelchair-B Curling Championship
- 2023 World Wheelchair Mixed Doubles Curling Championship
