= 2025 World Wheelchair Curling Championship =

- Host city: Stevenston, Scotland
- Arena: Auchenharvie Leisure Centre
- Dates: March 1–8
- Winner: China
- Skip: Wang Haitao
- Third: Chen Jianxin
- Second: Zhang Mingliang
- Lead: Li Nana
- Alternate: Zhang Qiang
- Coach: Li Jianrui
- Finalist: South Korea (Lee)

The 2025 World Wheelchair Curling Championship was held from March 1 to 8 at the Auchenharvie Leisure Centre in Stevenston, Scotland.

== Qualification ==
The following nations qualified to participate in the 2025 World Wheelchair Curling Championship:

Event	Vacancies	Qualified
Host nation	1	Scotland
2024 World Wheelchair Curling Championship	8	Norway; Canada; China; Sweden; Latvia; South Korea; Slovakia; Italy
2024 World Wheelchair-B Curling Championship	3	United States; Japan; England
TOTAL	12	

== Teams ==
The teams are listed as follows:

Canada	China	England	Italy
Fourth: Jon Thurston; Skip: Gil Dash; Second: Doug Dean; Lead: Collinda Joseph; Alternate: Chrissy Molnar	Skip: Wang Haitao; Third: Chen Jianxin; Second: Zhang Mingliang; Lead: Li Nana; Alternate: Zhang Qiang	Skip: Stewart Pimblett; Third: Jason Kean; Second: Karen Aspey; Lead: Julian Mattison; Alternate: George Potts	Skip: Egidio Marchese; Third: Fabrizio Bich (Note: Italy's alternate Emanuele Spelorzi threw third stones at the beginning of end 5 in Draw 17.); Second: Matteo Ronzani; Lead: Angela Menardi; Alternate: Emanuele Spelorzi
Japan	Latvia	Norway	Scotland
Fourth: Himori Takahashi; Skip: Kazuhiro Kashiwabara; Second: Hiroki Kagami; Lead: Kana Matsuda; Alternate: Hiroshi Wachi	Fourth: Agris Lasmans; Third: Sergejs Djačenko; Skip: Ojārs Briedis; Lead: Linda Meijere (Note: Latvia's alternate Poļina Rožkova threw lead stones at the beginning of end 5 in Draw 5.); Alternate: Poļina Rožkova	Skip: Jostein Stordahl; Third: Ole Fredrik Syversen; Second: Geir Arne Skogstad; Lead: Mia Larsen Sveberg; Alternate: Ingrid Djupskås	Skip: Hugh Nibloe; Third: Gary Smith (Note: Scotland's alternate Keith Gray threw third stones at the beginning of end 5 in Draw 17.); Second: Austin McKenzie (Note: Scotland's alternate Keith Gray threw second stones at the beginning of end 4 in Draw 10.); Lead: Jo Butterfield; Alternate: Keith Gray
Slovakia	South Korea	Sweden	United States
Skip: Radoslav Ďuriš; Third: Peter Zaťko; Second: Adrian Durček; Lead: Monika Kunkelová; Alternate: Betty Vorosova	Skip: Lee Hyeon-chul; Third: Nam Bong-kwang; Second: Yang Hui-tae; Lead: Yun Hee-keong; Alternate: Cha Jin-ho	Skip: Viljo Petersson-Dahl; Third: Ronny Persson; Second: Sabina Johansson; Lead: Kristina Ulander; Alternate: Tommy Andersson	Skip: Matthew Thums; Third: Shawn Sadowski; Second: Stephen Emt; Lead: Oyuna Uranchimeg; Alternate: Laura Dwyer

== Round robin standings ==
Final Round Robin Standings

Key
Teams to Playoffs
Teams Relegated to 2026 B Championship

Country	Skip	W	L	W–L	PF	PA	EW	EL	BE	SE	DSC
China	Wang Haitao	9	2	–	73	34	36	30	6	12	113.50
South Korea	Lee Hyeon-chul	8	3	–	70	52	42	32	5	18	109.72
Sweden	Viljo Petersson-Dahl	7	4	–	66	57	44	38	4	17	142.61
Norway	Jostein Stordahl	6	5	1–0	60	63	39	39	4	14	136.76
Canada	Gil Dash	6	5	0–1	75	58	42	34	0	11	113.55
Slovakia	Radoslav Ďuriš	5	6	2–0	69	63	39	33	1	19	103.10
Scotland	Hugh Nibloe	5	6	1–1	55	56	38	39	1	12	131.81
England	Stewart Pimblett	5	6	0–2	63	67	41	41	2	16	126.68
Japan	Kazuhoro Kashiwabara	4	7	2–0	57	73	35	44	1	12	126.84
Italy	Egidio Marchese	4	7	1–1	67	76	38	41	3	12	145.87
United States	Matthew Thums	4	7	0–2	54	74	33	49	1	8	121.46
Latvia	Ojārs Briedis	3	8	–	54	85	36	44	2	12	132.38

Round Robin Summary Table
Pos.	Country	Canada	China	England	Italy	Japan	Latvia	Norway	Scotland	Slovakia	South Korea	Sweden	United States	Record
5	Canada	—	6–8	5–10	9–3	8–2	9–2	4–7	12–6	6–3	4–6	4–5	8–6	6–5
1	China	8–6	—	6–1	8–2	6–3	10–5	5–2	2–3	7–2	11–2	7–4	3–4	9–2
8	England	10–5	1–6	—	6–4	4–7	5–8	6–8	5–7	2–10	7–5	7–6	10–1	5–6
10	Italy	3–9	2–8	4–6	—	5–8	7–8	9–6	7–4	14–5	3–9	5–6	8–7	4–7
9	Japan	2–8	3–6	7–4	8–5	—	5–7	4–8	5–7	3–12	3–7	8–5	9–4	4–7
12	Latvia	2–9	5–10	8–5	8–7	7–5	—	6–7	4–9	2–7	4–10	2–9	6–7	3–8
4	Norway	7–4	2–5	8–6	6–9	8–4	7–6	—	5–2	1–9	3–10	5–6	8–2	6–5
7	Scotland	6–12	3–2	7–5	4–7	7–5	9–4	2–5	—	6–11	7–1	5–9	5–6	5–6
6	Slovakia	3–6	2–7	10–2	5–14	12–3	7–2	9–1	11–6	—	3–10	3–4	4–8	5–6
2	South Korea	6–4	2–11	5–7	9–3	7–3	10–4	10–3	1–7	10–3	—	5–4	5–3	8–3
3	Sweden	5–4	4–7	6–7	6–5	5–8	9–2	6–5	9–5	4–3	4–5	—	8–6	7–4
11	United States	6–8	4–3	1–10	7–8	4–9	7–6	2–8	6–5	8–4	3–5	6–8	—	4–7

== Round robin results ==
All draws times are listed in Greenwich Mean Time (UTC±0).

=== Draw 1 ===
Saturday, March 1, 14:30

Sheet A	1	2	3	4	5	6	7	8	Final
Japan (Kashiwabara) 🔨	3	2	0	0	0	0	2	1	8
Sweden (Petersson-Dahl)	0	0	1	2	1	1	0	0	5

Sheet B	1	2	3	4	5	6	7	8	Final
Scotland (Nibloe) 🔨	1	0	0	0	0	0	1	1	3
China (Wang)	0	0	0	1	0	1	0	0	2

Sheet C	1	2	3	4	5	6	7	8	Final
Latvia (Briedis)	0	2	2	1	1	0	0	2	8
England (Pimblett) 🔨	2	0	0	0	0	1	2	0	5

Sheet D	1	2	3	4	5	6	7	8	Final
Italy (Marchese) 🔨	0	2	1	3	0	2	1	0	9
Norway (Stordahl)	0	0	0	0	5	0	0	1	6

=== Draw 2 ===
Saturday, March 1, 19:30

Sheet A	1	2	3	4	5	6	7	8	Final
Slovakia (Ďuriš) 🔨	0	0	2	1	0	0	X	X	3
South Korea (Lee)	1	1	0	0	4	4	X	X	10

Sheet B	1	2	3	4	5	6	7	8	EE	Final
England (Pimblett) 🔨	2	2	0	0	1	0	0	1	0	6
Norway (Stordahl)	0	0	1	1	0	1	3	0	2	8

Sheet C	1	2	3	4	5	6	7	8	Final
United States (Thums)	0	0	1	0	3	0	2	0	6
Canada (Dash) 🔨	1	2	0	1	0	3	0	1	8

Sheet D	1	2	3	4	5	6	7	8	Final
China (Wang)	0	0	0	3	2	0	2	X	7
Sweden (Petersson-Dahl) 🔨	0	2	1	0	0	1	0	X	4

=== Draw 3 ===
Sunday, March 2, 9:30

Sheet B	1	2	3	4	5	6	7	8	Final
Latvia (Briedis)	1	0	3	0	2	0	0	2	8
Italy (Marchese) 🔨	0	1	0	2	0	3	1	0	7

Sheet C	1	2	3	4	5	6	7	8	Final
Scotland (Nibloe)	0	1	1	0	2	2	0	1	7
Japan (Kashiwabara) 🔨	1	0	0	3	0	0	1	0	5

=== Draw 4 ===
Sunday, March 2, 14:30

Sheet A	1	2	3	4	5	6	7	8	Final
Norway (Stordal) 🔨	0	1	1	0	2	0	2	1	7
Canada (Dash)	0	0	0	1	0	3	0	0	4

Sheet B	1	2	3	4	5	6	7	8	Final
Sweden (Petersson-Dahl)	0	0	1	1	0	0	2	0	4
South Korea (Lee) 🔨	1	2	0	0	0	1	0	1	5

Sheet C	1	2	3	4	5	6	7	8	Final
China (Wang) 🔨	1	0	0	2	1	0	3	X	7
Slovakia (Ďuriš)	0	1	0	0	0	1	0	X	2

Sheet D	1	2	3	4	5	6	7	8	Final
United States (Thums) 🔨	0	1	0	0	0	0	0	X	1
England (Pimblett)	1	0	2	2	2	2	1	X	10

=== Draw 5 ===
Sunday, March 2, 19:30

Sheet A	1	2	3	4	5	6	7	8	EE	Final
United States (Thums) 🔨	1	1	2	0	0	1	0	0	1	6
Scotland (Nibloe)	0	0	0	2	1	0	1	1	0	5

Sheet B	1	2	3	4	5	6	7	8	Final
Japan (Kashiwabara) 🔨	0	1	0	1	0	0	X	X	2
Canada (Dash)	1	0	2	0	2	3	X	X	8

Sheet C	1	2	3	4	5	6	7	8	Final
South Korea (Lee) 🔨	1	0	4	2	0	1	1	X	9
Italy (Marchese)	0	1	0	0	2	0	0	X	3

Sheet D	1	2	3	4	5	6	7	8	Final
Latvia (Briedis) 🔨	0	1	1	0	0	0	0	X	2
Slovakia (Ďuriš)	2	0	0	1	1	1	2	X	7

=== Draw 6 ===
Monday, March 3, 9:30

Sheet A	1	2	3	4	5	6	7	8	Final
England (Pimblett) 🔨	0	1	0	0	0	0	0	X	1
China (Wang)	0	0	0	1	0	2	3	X	6

Sheet B	1	2	3	4	5	6	7	8	Final
Slovakia (Ďuriš)	0	2	1	0	1	0	0	X	4
United States (Thums) 🔨	2	0	0	2	0	2	2	X	8

Sheet C	1	2	3	4	5	6	7	8	EE	Final
Sweden (Petersson-Dahl)	0	1	0	1	0	0	1	2	1	6
Norway (Stordahl) 🔨	1	0	2	0	1	1	0	0	0	5

Sheet D	1	2	3	4	5	6	7	8	Final
Canada (Dash)	0	0	1	1	0	1	1	0	4
South Korea (Lee) 🔨	0	2	0	0	2	0	0	2	6

=== Draw 7 ===
Monday, March 3, 14:30

Sheet A	1	2	3	4	5	6	7	8	Final
Italy (Marchese)	1	0	2	0	0	1	4	0	8
United States (Thums) 🔨	0	2	0	4	0	0	0	1	7

Sheet B	1	2	3	4	5	6	7	8	Final
South Korea (Lee) 🔨	0	0	0	0	1	0	X	X	1
Scotland (Nibloe)	2	2	0	1	0	2	X	X	7

Sheet C	1	2	3	4	5	6	7	8	Final
Canada (Dash) 🔨	3	0	2	0	1	3	X	X	9
Latvia (Briedis)	0	1	0	1	0	0	X	X	2

Sheet D	1	2	3	4	5	6	7	8	Final
Slovakia (Ďuriš) 🔨	0	2	1	0	1	4	4	X	12
Japan (Kashiwabara)	2	0	0	1	0	0	0	X	3

=== Draw 8 ===
Monday, March 3, 19:30

Sheet A	1	2	3	4	5	6	7	8	Final
Sweden (Petersson-Dahl) 🔨	3	0	1	0	3	2	0	X	9
Scotland (Nibloe)	0	1	0	3	0	0	1	X	5

Sheet B	1	2	3	4	5	6	7	8	Final
Norway (Stordahl) 🔨	1	0	3	0	2	0	0	1	7
Latvia (Briedis)	0	4	0	0	0	1	1	0	6

Sheet C	1	2	3	4	5	6	7	8	Final
Japan (Kashiwabara) 🔨	1	0	0	1	0	1	0	X	3
China (Wang)	0	0	1	0	2	0	3	X	6

Sheet D	1	2	3	4	5	6	7	8	Final
England (Pimblett)	0	0	2	0	1	2	0	1	6
Italy (Marchese) 🔨	1	1	0	1	0	0	1	0	4

=== Draw 9 ===
Tuesday, March 4, 9:30

Sheet A	1	2	3	4	5	6	7	8	Final
Canada (Dash)	0	3	0	0	1	0	1	0	5
England (Pimblett) 🔨	1	0	1	3	0	1	0	4	10

Sheet B	1	2	3	4	5	6	7	8	Final
Sweden (Petersson-Dahl) 🔨	0	0	0	0	1	1	1	1	4
Slovakia (Ďuriš)	1	0	1	1	0	0	0	0	3

Sheet C	1	2	3	4	5	6	7	8	Final
Norway (Stordahl)	1	3	1	1	1	0	1	X	8
United States (Thums) 🔨	0	0	0	0	0	2	0	X	2

Sheet D	1	2	3	4	5	6	7	8	Final
South Korea (Lee) 🔨	0	1	0	0	0	1	0	X	2
China (Wang)	2	0	2	0	3	0	4	X	11

=== Draw 10 ===
Tuesday, March 4, 14:30

Sheet A	1	2	3	4	5	6	7	8	Final
Latvia (Briedis) 🔨	0	1	0	0	3	0	0	X	4
South Korea (Lee)	1	0	4	1	0	3	1	X	10

Sheet B	1	2	3	4	5	6	7	8	Final
Japan (Kashiwabara)	1	2	2	1	3	0	0	X	9
United States (Thums) 🔨	0	0	0	0	0	3	1	X	4

Sheet C	1	2	3	4	5	6	7	8	Final
Slovakia (Ďuriš) 🔨	2	0	1	0	2	0	0	X	5
Italy (Marchese)	0	0	0	5	0	4	5	X	14

Sheet D	1	2	3	4	5	6	7	8	Final
Canada (Dash)	3	0	4	0	1	0	4	X	12
Scotland (Nibloe) 🔨	0	2	0	2	0	2	0	X	6

=== Draw 11 ===
Tuesday, March 4, 19:30

Sheet A	1	2	3	4	5	6	7	8	Final
Norway (Stordahl) 🔨	5	0	1	0	1	1	0	X	8
Japan (Kashiwabara)	0	1	0	1	0	0	2	X	4

Sheet B	1	2	3	4	5	6	7	8	Final
China (Wang)	0	2	0	0	0	6	2	X	10
Latvia (Briedis) 🔨	1	0	2	1	1	0	0	X	5

Sheet C	1	2	3	4	5	6	7	8	Final
Scotland (Nibloe) 🔨	2	0	0	2	0	2	0	1	7
England (Pimblett)	0	1	2	0	1	0	1	0	5

Sheet D	1	2	3	4	5	6	7	8	Final
Italy (Marchese) 🔨	0	2	0	1	1	0	1	0	5
Sweden (Petersson-Dahl)	1	0	1	0	0	1	0	3	6

=== Draw 12 ===
Wednesday, March 5, 9:30

Sheet A	1	2	3	4	5	6	7	8	Final
Canada (Dash) 🔨	2	1	0	0	1	2	0	X	6
Slovakia (Ďuriš)	0	0	0	2	0	0	1	X	3

Sheet B	1	2	3	4	5	6	7	8	Final
Italy (Marchese)	0	2	0	1	0	1	1	0	5
Japan (Kashiwabara) 🔨	1	0	4	0	2	0	0	1	8

Sheet C	1	2	3	4	5	6	7	8	Final
United States (Thums)	1	0	0	2	0	0	0	X	3
South Korea (Lee) 🔨	0	0	1	0	2	1	1	X	5

Sheet D	1	2	3	4	5	6	7	8	Final
Scotland (Nibloe) 🔨	2	3	0	0	0	0	4	X	9
Latvia (Briedis)	0	0	1	1	1	1	0	X	4

=== Draw 13 ===
Wednesday, March 5, 14:30

Sheet A	1	2	3	4	5	6	7	8	Final
Japan (Kashiwabara)	0	0	1	0	2	0	2	0	5
Latvia (Briedis) 🔨	3	2	0	1	0	0	0	1	7

Sheet B	1	2	3	4	5	6	7	8	Final
England (Pimblett) 🔨	0	1	0	2	0	0	3	1	7
Sweden (Petersson-Dahl)	3	0	1	0	1	1	0	0	6

Sheet C	1	2	3	4	5	6	7	8	Final
Italy (Marchese)	1	1	0	0	3	0	0	2	7
Scotland (Nibloe) 🔨	0	0	1	1	0	1	1	0	4

Sheet D	1	2	3	4	5	6	7	8	Final
Norway (Stordahl)	0	0	1	0	0	1	0	X	2
China (Wang) 🔨	1	0	0	1	1	0	2	X	5

=== Draw 14 ===
Wednesday, March 5, 19:30

Sheet A	1	2	3	4	5	6	7	8	Final
South Korea (Lee) 🔨	2	0	3	1	0	2	2	X	10
Norway (Stordal)	0	1	0	0	2	0	0	X	3

Sheet B	1	2	3	4	5	6	7	8	Final
United States (Thums) 🔨	0	1	0	0	1	0	1	1	4
China (Wang)	1	0	0	1	0	1	0	0	3

Sheet C	1	2	3	4	5	6	7	8	Final
England (Pimblett)	0	0	1	0	1	0	0	X	2
Slovakia (Ďuriš) 🔨	2	1	0	2	0	2	3	X	10

Sheet D	1	2	3	4	5	6	7	8	EE	Final
Sweden (Petersson-Dahl)	0	0	2	0	1	0	1	0	1	5
Canada (Dash) 🔨	1	0	0	1	0	1	0	1	0	4

=== Draw 15 ===
Thursday, March 6, 9:30

Sheet A	1	2	3	4	5	6	7	8	Final
China (Wang) 🔨	2	0	4	1	1	0	X	X	8
Italy (Marchese)	0	1	0	0	0	1	X	X	2

Sheet B	1	2	3	4	5	6	7	8	Final
Scotland (Nibloe)	0	0	0	1	1	0	0	0	2
Norway (Stordahl) 🔨	0	0	1	0	0	2	1	1	5

Sheet C	1	2	3	4	5	6	7	8	Final
Latvia (Briedis)	0	0	0	1	0	1	0	X	2
Sweden (Petersson-Dahl) 🔨	2	1	1	0	3	0	2	X	9

Sheet D	1	2	3	4	5	6	7	8	Final
Japan (Kashiwabara)	0	0	0	0	1	1	1	4	7
England (Pimblett) 🔨	2	0	1	1	0	0	0	0	4

=== Draw 16 ===
Thursday, March 6, 14:30

Sheet A	1	2	3	4	5	6	7	8	EE	Final
Sweden (Petersson-Dahl) 🔨	1	0	0	0	2	3	0	0	2	8
United States (Thums)	0	0	1	0	0	0	3	2	0	6

Sheet B	1	2	3	4	5	6	7	8	Final
South Korea (Lee) 🔨	0	3	1	0	0	0	1	0	5
England (Pimblett)	1	0	0	1	1	1	0	3	7

Sheet C	1	2	3	4	5	6	7	8	Final
China (Wang) 🔨	3	0	3	0	2	0	0	X	8
Canada (Dash)	0	2	0	2	0	1	1	X	6

Sheet D	1	2	3	4	5	6	7	8	Final
Norway (Stordahl)	0	0	1	0	0	0	X	X	1
Slovakia (Ďuriš) 🔨	1	2	0	1	4	1	X	X	9

=== Draw 17 ===
Thursday, March 6, 19:30

Sheet A	1	2	3	4	5	6	7	8	Final
Slovakia (Ďuriš) 🔨	4	3	0	3	0	1	0	X	11
Scotland (Nibloe)	0	0	3	0	2	0	1	X	6

Sheet B	1	2	3	4	5	6	7	8	Final
Canada (Dash) 🔨	1	1	0	3	0	4	X	X	9
Italy (Marchese)	0	0	2	0	1	0	X	X	3

Sheet C	1	2	3	4	5	6	7	8	Final
South Korea (Lee)	0	1	1	1	1	1	0	2	7
Japan (Kashiwabara) 🔨	2	0	0	0	0	0	1	0	3

Sheet D	1	2	3	4	5	6	7	8	EE	Final
Latvia (Briedis) 🔨	2	1	0	0	0	1	0	2	0	6
United States (Thums)	0	0	3	1	1	0	1	0	1	7

== Playoffs ==
Qualification games
4	Norway	4
5	Canada	6
3	Sweden	4
6	Slovakia	8

Semifinals
1	China	5
5	Canada	4
2	South Korea	6
6	Slovakia	2

Final
1	China	14
2	South Korea	3
Bronze medal game
5	Canada	4
6	Slovakia	2

=== Qualification Games ===
Friday, March 7, 10:00

Sheet B	1	2	3	4	5	6	7	8	Final
Sweden (Petersson-Dahl) 🔨	1	0	1	0	0	1	0	0	3
Slovakia (Ďuriš)	0	0	0	2	0	0	1	1	4

Sheet D	1	2	3	4	5	6	7	8	EE	Final
Norway (Stordahl) 🔨	0	1	0	0	0	1	0	2	0	4
Canada (Dash)	1	0	0	1	1	0	1	0	2	6

=== Semifinals ===
Friday, March 7, 18:00

Sheet B	1	2	3	4	5	6	7	8	Final
China (Wang) 🔨	2	0	1	1	0	0	1	0	5
Canada (Dash)	0	1	0	0	0	2	0	1	4

Sheet D	1	2	3	4	5	6	7	8	Final
South Korea (Lee) 🔨	1	0	1	1	0	2	1	X	6
Slovakia (Ďuriš)	0	1	0	0	1	0	0	X	2

=== Bronze medal game ===
Saturday, March 8, 10:00

Sheet C	1	2	3	4	5	6	7	8	Final
Canada (Dash) 🔨	0	1	0	0	0	1	0	2	4
Slovakia (Ďuriš)	0	0	0	1	0	0	1	0	2

=== Final ===
Saturday, March 8, 14:30

Sheet C	1	2	3	4	5	6	7	8	Final
China (Wang) 🔨	4	0	4	2	0	4	X	X	14
South Korea (Lee)	0	2	0	0	1	0	X	X	3

== Final standings ==
Key
Teams relegated to 2026 B Championship

Place	Team
1st place, gold medalist(s)	China
2nd place, silver medalist(s)	South Korea
3rd place, bronze medalist(s)	Canada
4	Slovakia
5	Sweden
6	Norway
7	Scotland
8	England
9	Japan
10	Italy
11	United States
12	Latvia

== See also ==
- 2024 World Wheelchair-B Curling Championship
- 2025 World Wheelchair Mixed Doubles Curling Championship
