= 2024 World Wheelchair Curling Championship =

- Host city: Gangneung, South Korea
- Arena: Gangneung Curling Centre
- Dates: March 2–9
- Winner: Norway
- Skip: Jostein Stordahl
- Third: Ole Fredrik Syversen
- Second: Geir Arne Skogstad
- Lead: Mia Larsen Sveberg
- Alternate: Ingrid Djupskås
- Finalist: Canada (Ideson)

The 2024 World Wheelchair Curling Championship (branded as the 2024 SD Biosensor World Wheelchair Curling Championship for sponsorship reasons) was held from March 2 to 9 at the Gangneung Curling Centre in Gangneung, South Korea.

== Qualification ==
The following nations qualified to participate in the 2024 World Wheelchair Curling Championship:

Event	Vacancies	Qualified
Host nation	1	South Korea
2023 World Wheelchair Curling Championship	8	China; Canada; Scotland; Sweden; United States; Norway; Czech Republic; Latvia
2023 World Wheelchair-B Curling Championship	3	Slovakia; Estonia; Italy
TOTAL	12	

== Teams ==
The teams are listed as follows:

Canada	China	Czech Republic	Estonia
Fourth: Jon Thurston; Third: Ina Forrest; Second: Gil Dash; Skip: Mark Ideson; Alternate: Chrissy Molnar	Skip: Wang Haitao; Third: Zhang Shuaiyu; Second: Zhang Qiang; Lead: Yan Zhuo; Alternate: Peng Bing	Skip: Dana Selnekovičová; Third: Martin Tluk; Second: Milan Bartuněk; Lead: Jana Brincilova; Alternate: Petr Pesek	Skip: Ain Villau; Third: Mait Matas; Second: Katlin Riidebach; Lead: Signe Falkenberg
Italy	Latvia	Norway	Scotland
Skip: Egidio Marchese; Third: Fabrizio Bich; Second: Matteo Ronzani; Lead: Angela Menardi; Alternate: Orietta Berto	Fourth: Agris Lasmans; Third: Sergejs Djacenko; Skip: Ojārs Briedis; Lead: Linda Meijere; Alternate: Poļina Rožkova	Skip: Jostein Stordahl; Third: Ole Fredrik Syversen; Second: Geir Arne Skogstad; Lead: Mia Larsen Sveberg; Alternate: Ingrid Djupskås	Skip: Hugh Nibloe; Third: Gregor Ewan; Second: Gary Logan; Lead: Meggan Dawson-Farrell; Alternate: Bob McPherson
Slovakia	South Korea	Sweden	United States
Fourth: Peter Zaťko; Skip: Radoslav Ďuriš; Second: Dušan Pitoňák; Lead: Monika Kunkelová; Alternate: Adrian Durček	Fourth: Yang Hui-tae; Skip: Lee Hyeon-chul; Second: Jang Jae-hyuk; Lead: Yun Hee-keong; Alternate: Kim Jong-pan	Skip: Viljo Petersson-Dahl; Third: Ronny Persson; Second: Marcus Holm; Lead: Sabina Johansson; Alternate: Kristina Ulander	Skip: Matthew Thums; Third: Shawn Sadowski; Second: Stephen Emt; Lead: Batoyun Uranchimeg; Alternate: Laura Dwyer

== Round robin standings ==
Final Round Robin Standings

Key
Teams to Playoffs
Teams Relegated to 2024 B Championship

Country	Skip	W	L	W–L	PF	PA	EW	EL	BE	SE	DSC
China	Wang Haitao	8	3	2–1; 1–0	79	44	39	34	4	15	104.57
Canada	Mark Ideson	8	3	2–1; 0–1	80	51	42	36	1	14	98.13
Latvia	Ojārs Briedis	8	3	1–2; 1–0	66	58	39	39	1	14	123.48
South Korea	Lee Hyeon-chul	8	3	1–2; 0–1	82	47	44	25	3	23	89.79
Norway	Jostein Stordahl	7	4	–	57	60	39	41	1	20	90.53
Sweden	Viljo Petersson-Dahl	6	5	–	63	58	43	32	7	17	98.43
Slovakia	Radoslav Ďuriš	5	6	2–0	55	64	34	41	2	13	95.16
Italy	Egidio Marchese	5	6	1–1	52	67	32	37	3	12	106.95
United States	Matthew Thums	5	6	0–2	59	57	42	36	1	16	92.32
Scotland	Hugh Nibloe	3	8	–	54	62	37	44	1	18	105.23
Czech Republic	Dana Selnekovičová	2	9	–	39	84	28	46	4	6	103.99
Estonia	Ain Villau	1	10	–	48	82	34	42	1	13	110.03

Round Robin Summary Table
Pos.	Country	Canada	China	Czech Republic	Estonia	Italy	Latvia	Norway	Scotland	Slovakia	South Korea	Sweden	United States	Record
2	Canada	—	4–6	13–4	7–5	8–3	9–2	8–0	2–8	6–4	9–6	9–6	5–7	8–3
1	China	6–4	—	5–2	12–3	12–2	7–4	6–7	9–4	9–5	5–6	5–2	3–5	8–3
11	Czech Republic	4–13	2–5	—	6–4	5–6	4–10	3–7	6–5	3–6	2–7	1–10	3–11	2–9
12	Estonia	5–7	3–12	4–6	—	3–10	6–7	9–2	4–6	4–10	3–8	4–5	3–9	1–10
8	Italy	3–8	2–12	6–5	10–3	—	3–8	6–3	6–3	3–8	4–6	5–8	4–3	5–6
3	Latvia	2–9	4–7	10–4	7–6	8–3	—	6–3	6–5	5–7	8–7	5–4	5–3	8–3
5	Norway	0–8	7–6	7–3	2–9	3–6	3–6	—	6–5	7–3	6–5	7–6	9–3	7–4
10	Scotland	8–2	4–9	5–6	6–4	3–6	5–6	5–6	—	8–4	2–6	2–6	6–7	3–8
7	Slovakia	4–6	5–9	6–3	10–4	8–3	7–5	3–7	4–8	—	2–9	1–6	5–4	5–6
4	South Korea	6–9	6–5	7–2	8–3	6–4	7–8	5–6	6–2	9–2	—	14–4	8–2	8–3
6	Sweden	6–9	2–5	10–1	5–4	8–5	4–5	6–7	6–2	6–1	4–14	—	6–5	6–5
9	United States	7–5	5–3	11–3	9–3	3–4	3–5	3–9	7–6	4–5	2–8	5–6	—	5–6

== Round robin results ==
All draws times are listed in Korea Standard Time (UTC+09:00).

=== Draw 1 ===
Saturday, March 2, 14:00

Sheet A	1	2	3	4	5	6	7	8	Final
Norway (Stordahl)	2	0	1	0	3	0	1	X	7
Czech Republic (Selnekovičová) 🔨	0	1	0	2	0	0	0	X	3

Sheet B	1	2	3	4	5	6	7	8	Final
Latvia (Briedis) 🔨	0	0	2	0	0	2	1	1	6
Scotland (Nibloe)	1	2	0	1	1	0	0	0	5

Sheet C	1	2	3	4	5	6	7	8	Final
Canada (Ideson) 🔨	2	0	3	0	2	2	0	X	9
South Korea (Lee)	0	1	0	2	0	0	3	X	6

Sheet D	1	2	3	4	5	6	7	8	Final
Slovakia (Ďuriš)	0	2	1	1	4	0	2	X	10
Estonia (Villau) 🔨	3	0	0	0	0	1	0	X	4

=== Draw 2 ===
Saturday, March 2, 19:00

Sheet A	1	2	3	4	5	6	7	8	Final
Italy (Marchese) 🔨	1	0	0	1	0	1	1	0	4
United States (Thums)	0	0	1	0	1	0	0	1	3

Sheet B	1	2	3	4	5	6	7	8	Final
South Korea (Lee) 🔨	1	2	3	1	0	1	0	X	8
Estonia (Villau)	0	0	0	0	0	0	3	X	3

Sheet C	1	2	3	4	5	6	7	8	Final
Sweden (Petersson-Dahl) 🔨	0	0	0	0	1	0	1	0	2
China (Wang)	0	0	1	2	0	0	0	2	5

Sheet D	1	2	3	4	5	6	7	8	EE	Final
Scotland (Nibloe) 🔨	0	0	0	2	1	0	1	1	0	5
Norway (Stordahl)	1	1	2	0	0	1	0	0	1	6

=== Draw 3 ===
Sunday, March 3, 9:00

Sheet B	1	2	3	4	5	6	7	8	Final
Canada (Ideson) 🔨	1	0	1	0	0	0	3	1	6
Slovakia (Ďuriš)	0	1	0	2	0	1	0	0	4

Sheet C	1	2	3	4	5	6	7	8	Final
Latvia (Briedis) 🔨	0	1	3	0	3	2	1	X	10
Czech Republic (Selnekovičová)	3	0	0	1	0	0	0	X	4

=== Draw 4 ===
Sunday, March 3, 14:00

Sheet A	1	2	3	4	5	6	7	8	Final
Estonia (Villau)	0	1	0	0	1	0	1	X	3
China (Wang) 🔨	3	0	3	3	0	3	0	X	12

Sheet B	1	2	3	4	5	6	7	8	Final
Norway (Stordahl)	0	2	2	3	1	0	1	X	9
United States (Thums) 🔨	1	0	0	0	0	2	0	X	3

Sheet C	1	2	3	4	5	6	7	8	Final
Scotland (Nibloe) 🔨	2	0	0	0	0	0	1	X	3
Italy (Marchese)	0	1	1	1	1	2	0	X	6

Sheet D	1	2	3	4	5	6	7	8	Final
Sweden (Petersson-Dahl)	0	0	2	0	2	0	X	X	4
South Korea (Lee) 🔨	2	4	0	2	0	6	X	X	14

=== Draw 5 ===
Sunday, March 3, 19:00

Sheet A	1	2	3	4	5	6	7	8	Final
Sweden (Petersson-Dahl) 🔨	1	2	0	0	0	0	0	1	4
Latvia (Briedis)	0	0	1	0	1	3	0	0	5

Sheet B	1	2	3	4	5	6	7	8	Final
Czech Republic (Selnekovičová) 🔨	0	2	0	0	0	0	0	X	2
China (Wang)	1	0	2	0	1	1	0	X	5

Sheet C	1	2	3	4	5	6	7	8	Final
United States (Thums)	1	0	0	1	0	1	1	0	4
Slovakia (Ďuriš) 🔨	0	2	1	0	1	0	0	1	5

Sheet D	1	2	3	4	5	6	7	8	Final
Canada (Ideson)	1	0	2	2	1	0	2	X	8
Italy (Marchese) 🔨	0	2	0	0	0	1	0	X	3

=== Draw 6 ===
Monday, March 4, 9:00

Sheet A	1	2	3	4	5	6	7	8	Final
South Korea (Lee) 🔨	0	1	0	1	1	2	1	X	6
Scotland (Nibloe)	1	0	1	0	0	0	0	X	2

Sheet B	1	2	3	4	5	6	7	8	Final
Italy (Marchese) 🔨	1	0	3	0	1	0	0	0	5
Sweden (Petersson-Dahl)	0	3	0	2	0	2	0	1	8

Sheet C	1	2	3	4	5	6	7	8	Final
Norway (Stordahl) 🔨	0	0	0	1	1	0	0	X	2
Estonia (Villau)	3	0	4	0	0	1	1	X	9

Sheet D	1	2	3	4	5	6	7	8	Final
China (Wang)	0	0	2	0	0	0	0	1	3
United States (Thums) 🔨	1	1	0	1	1	1	0	0	5

=== Draw 7 ===
Monday, March 4, 14:00

Sheet A	1	2	3	4	5	6	7	8	Final
Slovakia (Ďuriš) 🔨	0	0	1	0	0	0	0	X	1
Sweden (Petersson-Dahl)	1	0	0	2	1	1	1	X	6

Sheet B	1	2	3	4	5	6	7	8	Final
United States (Thums)	0	0	1	0	1	0	1	X	3
Latvia (Briedis) 🔨	1	2	0	1	0	1	0	X	5

Sheet C	1	2	3	4	5	6	7	8	Final
China (Wang)	0	1	0	1	2	0	2	0	6
Canada (Ideson) 🔨	1	0	1	0	0	1	0	1	4

Sheet D	1	2	3	4	5	6	7	8	Final
Italy (Marchese) 🔨	0	2	0	2	0	1	0	1	6
Czech Republic (Selnekovičová)	1	0	1	0	2	0	1	0	5

=== Draw 8 ===
Monday, March 4, 19:00

Sheet A	1	2	3	4	5	6	7	8	Final
Latvia (Briedis)	0	2	2	1	0	0	1	X	6
Norway (Stordahl) 🔨	1	0	0	0	1	1	0	X	3

Sheet B	1	2	3	4	5	6	7	8	Final
Estonia (Villau) 🔨	1	0	0	0	2	1	1	X	5
Canada (Ideson)	0	5	1	1	0	0	0	X	7

Sheet C	1	2	3	4	5	6	7	8	Final
Czech Republic (Selnekovičová) 🔨	3	1	0	0	1	0	0	1	6
Scotland (Nibloe)	0	0	1	1	0	2	1	0	5

Sheet D	1	2	3	4	5	6	7	8	Final
South Korea (Lee) 🔨	1	2	1	0	1	3	1	X	9
Slovakia (Ďuriš)	0	0	0	2	0	0	0	X	2

=== Draw 9 ===
Tuesday, March 5, 9:00

Sheet A	1	2	3	4	5	6	7	8	Final
China (Wang) 🔨	0	1	0	0	1	0	3	0	5
South Korea (Lee)	0	0	1	2	0	1	0	2	6

Sheet B	1	2	3	4	5	6	7	8	Final
Norway (Stordahl) 🔨	0	2	0	0	0	1	0	0	3
Italy (Marchese)	2	0	0	1	1	0	1	1	6

Sheet C	1	2	3	4	5	6	7	8	EE	Final
Estonia (Villau) 🔨	1	0	0	1	0	0	2	0	0	4
Sweden (Petersson-Dahl)	0	0	2	0	0	1	0	1	1	5

Sheet D	1	2	3	4	5	6	7	8	Final
United States (Thums) 🔨	1	1	2	1	0	0	0	2	7
Scotland (Nibloe)	0	0	0	0	1	4	1	0	6

=== Draw 10 ===
Tuesday, March 5, 14:00

Sheet A	1	2	3	4	5	6	7	8	Final
Canada (Ideson) 🔨	0	2	0	2	0	1	0	0	5
United States (Thums)	1	0	1	0	2	0	1	2	7

Sheet B	1	2	3	4	5	6	7	8	Final
Czech Republic (Selnekovičová)	0	0	0	0	0	1	0	X	1
Sweden (Petersson-Dahl) 🔨	1	1	2	1	2	0	3	X	10

Sheet C	1	2	3	4	5	6	7	8	Final
Italy (Marchese)	0	0	0	3	0	0	0	X	3
Slovakia (Ďuriš) 🔨	1	0	1	0	4	1	1	X	8

Sheet D	1	2	3	4	5	6	7	8	Final
China (Wang) 🔨	0	0	4	0	2	0	1	X	7
Latvia (Briedis)	0	2	0	1	0	1	0	X	4

=== Draw 11 ===
Tuesday, March 5, 19:00

Sheet A	1	2	3	4	5	6	7	8	Final
Estonia (Villau) 🔨	1	0	0	1	0	0	2	0	4
Czech Republic (Selnekovičová)	0	1	1	0	1	1	0	2	6

Sheet B	1	2	3	4	5	6	7	8	Final
Scotland (Nibloe)	0	1	1	3	1	0	2	X	8
Canada (Ideson) 🔨	1	0	0	0	0	1	0	X	2

Sheet C	1	2	3	4	5	6	7	8	Final
Latvia (Briedis)	0	0	2	0	3	0	1	2	8
South Korea (Lee) 🔨	3	2	0	1	0	1	0	0	7

Sheet D	1	2	3	4	5	6	7	8	Final
Slovakia (Ďuriš)	0	0	0	2	0	0	1	X	3
Norway (Stordahl) 🔨	3	1	1	0	1	1	0	X	7

=== Draw 12 ===
Wednesday, March 6, 9:00

Sheet A	1	2	3	4	5	6	7	8	Final
China (Wang) 🔨	4	2	0	3	1	2	X	X	12
Italy (Marchese)	0	0	2	0	0	0	X	X	2

Sheet B	1	2	3	4	5	6	7	8	Final
Slovakia (Ďuriš)	3	0	0	1	0	2	0	X	6
Czech Republic (Selnekovičová) 🔨	0	1	0	0	0	0	2	X	3

Sheet C	1	2	3	4	5	6	7	8	Final
Sweden (Petersson-Dahl)	0	2	1	0	1	0	0	2	6
United States (Thums) 🔨	1	0	0	2	0	1	1	0	5

Sheet D	1	2	3	4	5	6	7	8	Final
Latvia (Briedis)	0	1	0	1	0	0	X	X	2
Canada (Ideson) 🔨	2	0	3	0	2	2	X	X	9

=== Draw 13 ===
Wednesday, March 6, 14:00

Sheet A	1	2	3	4	5	6	7	8	Final
Czech Republic (Selnekovičová) 🔨	1	1	0	2	0	0	X	X	4
Canada (Ideson)	0	0	3	0	7	3	X	X	13

Sheet B	1	2	3	4	5	6	7	8	EE	Final
South Korea (Lee) 🔨	0	1	1	1	1	1	0	0	0	5
Norway (Stordahl)	1	0	0	0	0	0	2	2	1	6

Sheet C	1	2	3	4	5	6	7	8	EE	Final
Slovakia (Ďuriš) 🔨	1	0	1	0	1	0	2	0	2	7
Latvia (Briedis)	0	0	0	1	0	1	0	3	0	5

Sheet D	1	2	3	4	5	6	7	8	Final
Scotland (Nibloe) 🔨	1	0	1	0	4	0	0	X	6
Estonia (Villau)	0	1	0	1	0	1	1	X	4

=== Draw 14 ===
Wednesday, March 6, 19:00

Sheet A	1	2	3	4	5	6	7	8	Final
United States (Thums) 🔨	0	0	3	3	1	2	X	X	9
Estonia (Villau)	1	2	0	0	0	0	X	X	3

Sheet B	1	2	3	4	5	6	7	8	Final
Sweden (Petersson-Dahl)	1	1	0	2	1	0	1	X	6
Scotland (Nibloe) 🔨	0	0	1	0	0	1	0	X	2

Sheet C	1	2	3	4	5	6	7	8	Final
South Korea (Lee) 🔨	1	0	2	0	2	0	0	1	6
Italy (Marchese)	0	2	0	1	0	1	0	0	4

Sheet D	1	2	3	4	5	6	7	8	EE	Final
Norway (Stordahl)	1	0	2	0	1	2	0	0	1	7
China (Wang) 🔨	0	1	0	1	0	0	3	1	0	6

=== Draw 15 ===
Thursday, March 7, 9:00

Sheet A	1	2	3	4	5	6	7	8	Final
Scotland (Nibloe)	1	1	3	0	2	0	1	X	8
Slovakia (Ďuriš) 🔨	0	0	0	2	0	2	0	X	4

Sheet B	1	2	3	4	5	6	7	8	Final
Latvia (Briedis)	0	0	0	3	0	0	1	3	7
Estonia (Villau) 🔨	1	1	1	0	2	1	0	0	6

Sheet C	1	2	3	4	5	6	7	8	Final
Canada (Ideson) 🔨	1	1	2	2	1	1	X	X	8
Norway (Stordahl)	0	0	0	0	0	0	X	X	0

Sheet D	1	2	3	4	5	6	7	8	Final
Czech Republic (Selnekovičová) 🔨	0	0	0	0	1	0	1	X	2
South Korea (Lee)	1	1	1	1	0	3	0	X	7

=== Draw 16 ===
Thursday, March 7, 14:00

Sheet A	1	2	3	4	5	6	7	8	Final
Norway (Stordahl)	0	4	0	1	1	0	1	0	7
Sweden (Petersson-Dahl) 🔨	2	0	0	0	0	2	0	2	6

Sheet B	1	2	3	4	5	6	7	8	Final
United States (Thums) 🔨	1	0	1	0	0	0	0	X	2
South Korea (Lee)	0	3	0	0	0	4	1	X	8

Sheet C	1	2	3	4	5	6	7	8	Final
Scotland (Nibloe)	0	0	0	1	1	2	0	X	4
China (Wang) 🔨	4	2	0	0	0	0	3	X	9

Sheet D	1	2	3	4	5	6	7	8	Final
Estonia (Villau)	0	0	0	0	1	1	1	X	3
Italy (Marchese) 🔨	5	2	2	1	0	0	0	X	10

=== Draw 17 ===
Thursday, March 7, 19:00

Sheet A	1	2	3	4	5	6	7	8	Final
Italy (Marchese)	1	0	1	0	0	1	0	X	3
Latvia (Briedis) 🔨	0	2	0	4	1	0	1	X	8

Sheet B	1	2	3	4	5	6	7	8	Final
China (Wang)	1	2	1	0	0	0	5	X	9
Slovakia (Ďuriš) 🔨	0	0	0	3	1	1	0	X	5

Sheet C	1	2	3	4	5	6	7	8	Final
United States (Thums) 🔨	3	1	3	0	3	0	1	X	11
Czech Republic (Selnekovičová)	0	0	0	1	0	2	0	X	3

Sheet D	1	2	3	4	5	6	7	8	EE	Final
Canada (Ideson)	0	1	0	0	2	0	3	0	3	9
Sweden (Petersson-Dahl) 🔨	1	0	1	2	0	1	0	1	0	6

== Playoffs ==
Qualification games
4	South Korea	3
5	Norway	6
3	Latvia	6
6	Sweden	7

Semifinals
1	China	3
5	Norway	7
2	Canada	4
6	Sweden	2

Final
5	Norway	6
2	Canada	2
Bronze medal game
1	China	6
6	Sweden	3

=== Qualification Games ===
Friday, March 8, 14:00

Sheet A	1	2	3	4	5	6	7	8	Final
Latvia (Briedis) 🔨	0	0	0	2	1	2	1	0	6
Sweden (Petersson-Dahl)	1	3	2	0	0	0	0	1	7

Sheet D	1	2	3	4	5	6	7	8	Final
South Korea (Lee) 🔨	2	0	0	0	0	0	1	0	3
Norway (Stordahl)	0	2	1	1	1	0	0	1	6

=== Semifinals ===
Friday, March 8, 19:00

Sheet A	1	2	3	4	5	6	7	8	Final
China (Wang) 🔨	2	0	0	0	1	0	0	X	3
Norway (Stordahl)	0	1	0	2	0	2	2	X	7

Sheet D	1	2	3	4	5	6	7	8	Final
Canada (Ideson) 🔨	0	0	1	0	0	2	1	X	4
Sweden (Petersson-Dahl)	0	1	0	1	0	0	0	X	2

=== Bronze medal game ===
Saturday, March 9, 11:00

Team	1	2	3	4	5	6	7	8	Final
China (Wang) 🔨	2	1	1	0	1	1	0	X	6
Sweden (Petersson-Dahl)	0	0	0	2	0	0	1	X	3

=== Final ===
Saturday, March 9, 11:00

Team	1	2	3	4	5	6	7	8	Final
Norway (Stordahl)	0	1	1	1	1	0	2	X	6
Canada (Ideson) 🔨	1	0	0	0	0	1	0	X	2

== Final standings ==
Key
Teams relegated to 2024 B Championship

Place	Team
1st place, gold medalist(s)	Norway
2nd place, silver medalist(s)	Canada
3rd place, bronze medalist(s)	China
4	Sweden
5	Latvia
6	South Korea
7	Slovakia
8	Italy
9	United States
10	Scotland
11	Czech Republic
12	Estonia

== See also ==
- 2023 World Wheelchair-B Curling Championship
- 2024 World Wheelchair Mixed Doubles Curling Championship
