= 2026 World Wheelchair-B Curling Championship =

- Host city: Lohja, Finland
- Arena: Kisakallio Sports Institute
- Dates: November 23–28

The 2026 World Wheelchair-B Curling Championship will be held from November 23 to 28 at the Kisakallio Sports Institute in Lohja, Finland. The top three placing teams will qualify for the 2027 World Wheelchair Curling Championship also in Lohja, Finland.

== Teams ==
The teams are as follows:

Armenia	Australia	Chinese Taipei	Czech Republic
Skip: Arshak Oganesyan; Third: Arpine Harutyunyan; Second: Shiraz Amirkhanyan; Lead: Erik Mkrtchyan; Alternate: Smbat Karapetyan	Skip: Mark Ferguson; Third: Mark Blowers; Second: Mike Dow; Lead: Carol Cooke	Skip: Cheng Pang-yen; Third: Huang Kai-lun; Second: Kao Ming-hsien; Lead: Yuan Pi-hui; Alternate: Chang Chih-ling	Skip: Dana Selnekovičová; Third: Martin Tluk; Second: Milan Bartůněk; Lead: Eva Lubinová; Alternate: Luboš Uher
France	Italy	Japan	Latvia
Skip: Jean-Yves Le Meur; Third: Cyril More; Second: David Dussaux; Lead: Isabelle Emonet	Skip: Fabrizio Bich; Third: Davide Giozet; Second: Paolo Ioriatti; Lead: Orietta Berto; Alternate: Angela Menardi	Fourth: Hiromi Takahashi; Skip: Kazuhiro Kashiwabara; Second: Hiroki Kagami; Lead: Kana Matsuda; Alternate: Takashi Sakataya	Fourth: Agris Lasmans; Skip: Poļina Rožkova; Second: Linda Meijere; Lead: Elija Asnina; Alternate: Aleksandrs Vitohins
Poland	Spain	Switzerland	United States
Skip: Łukasz Waszek; Third: Michal Gasik-Daszkowski; Second: Mariusz Włodarski; Lead: Monika Bodych; Alternate: Agata Linde	Skip: Bertrand Tramont; Third: Angel Pinyol Gomez; Second: Anna Nadal Rodriguez; Lead: Nathalie Carpanedo Noireau; Alternate: Carlos Martinez	Fourth: Murad Mirza; Skip: Konstantin Schmaeh; Second: Pierre-Alain Tercier; Lead: Stephanie Combremont; Alternate: Oleksii Muravshchykov	Skip: Sean O'Neill; Third: Stephen Emt; Second: Shawn Sadowski; Lead: Laura Dwyer; Alternate: Katie Verderber

== Round robin standings ==
Key
Teams to Playoffs

Group A	Skip	W	L	W–L	DSC
Australia	Mark Ferguson	0	0	–	0.000
Chinese Taipei	Cheng Pang-yen	0	0	–	0.000
Italy	Fabrizio Bich	0	0	–	0.000
Poland	Łukasz Waszek	0	0	–	0.000
Switzerland	Konstantin Schmaeh	0	0	–	0.000
United States	Sean O'Neill	0	0	–	0.000

Group B	Skip	W	L	W–L	DSC
Armenia	Arshak Oganesyan	0	0	–	0.000
Czech Republic	Dana Selnekovičová	0	0	–	0.000
France	Jean-Yves Le Meur	0	0	–	0.000
Japan	Kazuhiro Kashiwabara	0	0	–	0.000
Latvia	Poļina Rožkova	0	0	–	0.000
Spain	Bertrand Tramont	0	0	–	0.000

Group A Round Robin Summary Table
Pos.	Country	Australia	Chinese Taipei	Italy	Poland	Switzerland	United States	Record
1	Australia	—	D3	D5	D1	D7	D9	0–0
1	Chinese Taipei	D3	—	D9	D7	D5	D1	0–0
1	Italy	D5	D9	—	D3	D1	D7	0–0
1	Poland	D1	D7	D3	—	D9	D5	0–0
1	Switzerland	D7	D5	D1	D9	—	D3	0–0
1	United States	D9	D1	D7	D5	D3	—	0–0

Group B Round Robin Summary Table
Pos.	Country	Armenia	Czech Republic	France	Japan	Latvia	Spain	Record
1	Armenia	—	D4	D6	D8	D10	D2	0–0
1	Czech Republic	D4	—	D2	D6	D8	D10	0–0
1	France	D6	D2	—	D10	D4	D8	0–0
1	Japan	D8	D6	D10	—	D2	D4	0–0
1	Latvia	D10	D8	D4	D2	—	D6	0–0
1	Spain	D2	D10	D8	D4	D6	—	0–0

== Round robin results ==
All draw times are listed in Eastern European Summer Time (UTC+03:00).

=== Draw 1 ===
Monday, November 23, 9:30

Sheet A	1	2	3	4	5	6	7	8	Final
Switzerland (Schmaeh)									0
Italy (Bich)									0

Sheet B	1	2	3	4	5	6	7	8	Final
United States (O'Neill)									0
Chinese Taipei (Cheng)									0

Sheet C	1	2	3	4	5	6	7	8	Final
Australia (Ferguson)									0
Poland (Waszek)									0

=== Draw 2 ===
Monday, November 23, 14:00

Sheet A	1	2	3	4	5	6	7	8	Final
Spain (Tramont)									0
Armenia (Oganesyan)									0

Sheet B	1	2	3	4	5	6	7	8	Final
Czech Republic (Selnekovičová)									0
France (Le Meur)									0

Sheet C	1	2	3	4	5	6	7	8	Final
Japan (Kashiwabara)									0
Latvia (Rožkova)									0

=== Draw 3 ===
Monday, November 23, 18:30

Sheet A	1	2	3	4	5	6	7	8	Final
Italy (Bich)									0
Poland (Waszek)									0

Sheet B	1	2	3	4	5	6	7	8	Final
Australia (Ferguson)									0
Chinese Taipei (Cheng)									0

Sheet C	1	2	3	4	5	6	7	8	Final
Switzerland (Schmaeh)									0
United States (O'Neill)									0

=== Draw 4 ===
Tuesday, November 24, 10:00

Sheet A	1	2	3	4	5	6	7	8	Final
France (Le Meur)									0
Latvia (Rožkova)									0

Sheet B	1	2	3	4	5	6	7	8	Final
Spain (Tramont)									0
Japan (Kashiwabara)									0

Sheet C	1	2	3	4	5	6	7	8	Final
Armenia (Oganesyan)									0
Czech Republic (Selnekovičová)									0

=== Draw 5 ===
Tuesday, November 24, 15:00

Sheet A	1	2	3	4	5	6	7	8	Final
Poland (Waszek)									0
United States (O'Neill)									0

Sheet B	1	2	3	4	5	6	7	8	Final
Chinese Taipei (Cheng)									0
Switzerland (Schmaeh)									0

Sheet C	1	2	3	4	5	6	7	8	Final
Italy (Bich)									0
Australia (Ferguson)									0

=== Draw 6 ===
Wednesday, November 25, 9:30

Sheet A	1	2	3	4	5	6	7	8	Final
Czech Republic (Selnekovičová)									0
Japan (Kashiwabara)									0

Sheet B	1	2	3	4	5	6	7	8	Final
Latvia (Rožkova)									0
Spain (Tramont)									0

Sheet C	1	2	3	4	5	6	7	8	Final
France (Le Meur)									0
Armenia (Oganesyan)									0

=== Draw 7 ===
Wednesday, November 25, 14:00

Sheet A	1	2	3	4	5	6	7	8	Final
Australia (Ferguson)									0
Switzerland (Schmaeh)									0

Sheet B	1	2	3	4	5	6	7	8	Final
Italy (Bich)									0
United States (O'Neill)									0

Sheet C	1	2	3	4	5	6	7	8	Final
Poland (Waszek)									0
Chinese Taipei (Cheng)									0

=== Draw 8 ===
Wednesday, November 25, 18:30

Sheet A	1	2	3	4	5	6	7	8	Final
Latvia (Rožkova)									0
Czech Republic (Selnekovičová)									0

Sheet B	1	2	3	4	5	6	7	8	Final
Japan (Kashiwabara)									0
Armenia (Oganesyan)									0

Sheet C	1	2	3	4	5	6	7	8	Final
Spain (Tramont)									0
France (Le Meur)									0

=== Draw 9 ===
Thursday, November 26, 10:00

Sheet A	1	2	3	4	5	6	7	8	Final
United States (O'Neill)									0
Australia (Ferguson)									0

Sheet B	1	2	3	4	5	6	7	8	Final
Switzerland (Schmaeh)									0
Poland (Waszek)									0

Sheet C	1	2	3	4	5	6	7	8	Final
Chinese Taipei (Cheng)									0
Italy (Bich)									0

=== Draw 10 ===
Thursday, November 26, 15:00

Sheet A	1	2	3	4	5	6	7	8	Final
Japan (Kashiwabara)									0
France (Le Meur)									0

Sheet B	1	2	3	4	5	6	7	8	Final
Armenia (Oganesyan)									0
Latvia (Rožkova)									0

Sheet C	1	2	3	4	5	6	7	8	Final
Czech Republic (Selnekovičová)									0
Spain (Tramont)									0

== Playoffs ==
Qualification games
B2
A3
A2
B3

Semifinals
A1
B1

Gold medal game
Bronze medal game

=== Qualification games ===
Friday, November 27, 10:00

Sheet A	1	2	3	4	5	6	7	8	Final
B2									0
A3									0

Sheet C	1	2	3	4	5	6	7	8	Final
A2									0
B3									0

=== Semifinals ===
Friday, November 27, 16:00

Sheet A	1	2	3	4	5	6	7	8	Final
B1									0
									0

Sheet C	1	2	3	4	5	6	7	8	Final
A1									0
									0

=== Bronze medal game ===
Saturday, November 28, 10:00

Sheet B	1	2	3	4	5	6	7	8	Final
									0
									0

=== Gold medal game ===
Saturday, November 28, 14:00

Sheet B	1	2	3	4	5	6	7	8	Final
									0
									0

== Final standings ==
Key
Teams Advance to the 2027 World Wheelchair Curling Championship

Place	Team
1st place, gold medalist(s)	
2nd place, silver medalist(s)	
3rd place, bronze medalist(s)	
4	
5	
6	
7	
8	
9	
10	
11	
12	
