= 2021 World Wheelchair Curling Championship =

- Host city: Beijing, China
- Arena: Beijing National Aquatics Center
- Dates: October 23 – 30
- Winner: China
- Skip: Wang Haitao
- Third: Chen Jianxin
- Second: Zhang Mingliang
- Lead: Yan Zhou
- Alternate: Sun Yulong
- Coach: Yue Qingshuang, Zhao Ran
- Finalist: Sweden

The 2021 World Wheelchair Curling Championship (branded as the 2021 KUNTAI World Wheelchair Curling Championship for sponsorship reasons) was held October 23 to 30 at the Beijing National Aquatics Center in Beijing, China. The venue also served as the location for the curling events at the 2022 Winter Olympics.

== Qualification ==
The following nations qualified to participate in the 2021 World Wheelchair Curling Championship:

Event	Vacancies	Qualified
Host nation	1	China
2020 World Wheelchair Curling Championship	8	RCF; Canada; Sweden; Norway; South Korea; Latvia; Slovakia; Scotland
2020 World Wheelchair-B Curling Championship	3	United States; Switzerland; Italy
TOTAL	12	

== Teams ==
The teams are listed as follows:

Canada	China	Italy	Latvia
Fourth: Jon Thurston; Third: Ina Forrest; Second: Dennis Thiessen; Skip: Mark Ideson; Alternate: Collinda Joseph; Coach: Michael Lizmore, Wendy Morgan (NC)	Skip: Wang Haitao; Third: Chen Jianxin; Second: Zhang Mingliang; Lead: Yan Zhou; Alternate: Sun Yulong; Coach: Yue Qingshuang, Zhao Ran	Fourth: Egidio Marchese; Third: Paolo Ioriatti; Second: Matteo Ronzani; Skip: Angela Menardi; Alternate: Orietta Berto; Coach: Roberto Maino	Skip: Poļina Rožkova; Third: Sergejs Djačenko; Second: Agris Lasmans; Lead: Ojārs Briedis; Alternate: Aleksandrs Dimbovskis; Coach: Arnis Veidemanis, Rihards Jeske
Norway	RCF	Scotland	Slovakia
Skip: Jostein Stordahl; Third: Ole Fredrik Syversen; Second: Geir Arne Skogstad; Lead: Sissel Løchen; Alternate: Mia Sveberg; Coach: Peter Dahlman	Skip: Konstantin Kurokhtin; Third: Andrei Meshcheriakov; Second: Vitaly Danilov; Lead: Daria Shchukina; Alternate: Olga Beliak; Coach: Anton Batugin, Sergey Shamov	Skip: Hugh Nibloe; Third: Gregor Ewan; Second: David Melrose; Lead: Meggan Dawson-Farrell; Alternate: Charlotte McKenna; Coach: Sheila Swan	Skip: Radoslav Ďuriš; Third: Dušan Pitoňák; Second: Peter Zaťko; Lead: Monika Kunkelová; Alternate: Imrich Lyócsa; Coach: Frantisek Pitonak
South Korea	Sweden	Switzerland	United States
Skip: Jang Jae-hyuk; Third: Go Seung-nam; Second: Jung Sung-hun; Lead: Baek Hye-jin; Alternate: Yoon Eun-gu; Coach: Lim Sung-min, Kim Seung-min	Skip: Viljo Petersson-Dahl; Third: Ronny Persson; Second: Mats-Ola Engborg; Lead: Kristina Ulander; Alternate: Sabina Johansson; Coach: Alison Kreviazuk, Peter Narup (NC)	Skip: Eric Décorvet; Third: Hans Burgener; Second: Françoise Jaquerod; Lead: Laurent Kneubühl; Alternate: Patrick Delacrétaz; Coach: Stephan Pfister, Lukas Haggenmacher	Skip: Matthew Thums; Third: Stephen Emt; Second: David Samsa; Lead: Pamela Wilson; Alternate: Batoyun Uranchimeg; Coach: Russell Schieber

== Round-robin standings ==
Final round-robin standings

Key
Teams to Playoffs
Teams relegated to 2022 B Championship

Country	Skip	W	L	W–L
China	Wang Haitao	9	2	–
RCF	Konstantin Kurokhtin	8	3	2–0
Sweden	Viljo Petersson-Dahl	8	3	1–1
United States	Matthew Thums	8	3	0–2
Canada	Mark Ideson	7	4	–
Scotland	Hugh Nibloe	6	5	–
Norway	Jostein Stordahl	5	6	–
Latvia	Poļina Rožkova	4	7	1–0
South Korea	Jang Jae-hyuk	4	7	0–1
Slovakia	Radoslav Ďuriš	3	8	–
Italy	Angela Menardi	2	9	1–0
Switzerland	Eric Décorvet	2	9	0–1

== Round-robin results ==
All draws times are listed in China Standard Time (UTC+08:00).

=== Draw 1 ===
Saturday, October 23, 14:05

Sheet A	1	2	3	4	5	6	7	8	Final
Norway (Stordahl) 🔨	0	2	1	1	0	0	0	0	4
Scotland (Nibloe)	2	0	0	0	1	2	0	1	6

Sheet B	1	2	3	4	5	6	7	8	EE	Final
Italy (Menardi) 🔨	0	0	0	0	3	1	1	0	2	7
Switzerland (Décorvet)	1	1	0	2	0	0	0	1	0	5

Sheet C	1	2	3	4	5	6	7	8	Final
China (Wang) 🔨	2	0	2	0	2	2	0	X	8
Slovakia (Ďuriš)	0	1	0	2	0	0	1	X	4

Sheet D	1	2	3	4	5	6	7	8	Final
RCF (Kurokhtin)	1	1	0	1	2	3	X	X	8
Latvia (Rožkova) 🔨	0	0	2	0	0	0	X	X	2

=== Draw 2 ===
Saturday, October 23, 19:05

Sheet A	1	2	3	4	5	6	7	8	Final
Canada (Ideson)	0	0	0	2	0	1	0	1	4
United States (Thums) 🔨	2	0	1	0	1	0	2	0	6

Sheet B	1	2	3	4	5	6	7	8	Final
Slovakia (Ďuriš)	1	0	3	0	0	0	1	0	5
Latvia (Rožkova) 🔨	0	2	0	3	1	1	0	1	8

Sheet C	1	2	3	4	5	6	7	8	Final
Sweden (Petersson-Dahl)	3	0	0	0	0	3	0	3	9
South Korea (Jang) 🔨	0	1	1	1	1	0	1	0	5

Sheet D	1	2	3	4	5	6	7	8	Final
Switzerland (Décorvet) 🔨	0	0	1	0	0	0	X	X	1
Norway (Stordahl)	1	2	0	2	2	1	X	X	8

=== Draw 3 ===
Sunday, October 24, 9:05

Sheet B	1	2	3	4	5	6	7	8	Final
China (Wang) 🔨	0	1	4	0	1	0	2	X	8
RCF (Kurokhtin)	0	0	0	1	0	1	0	X	2

Sheet C	1	2	3	4	5	6	7	8	Final
Italy (Menardi) 🔨	3	0	1	0	0	0	0	X	4
Scotland (Nibloe)	0	2	0	1	2	1	4	X	10

=== Draw 4 ===
Sunday, October 24, 14:05

Sheet A	1	2	3	4	5	6	7	8	Final
Latvia (Rožkova) 🔨	1	0	0	1	1	2	1	0	6
South Korea (Jang)	0	3	1	0	0	0	0	1	5

Sheet B	1	2	3	4	5	6	7	8	Final
Norway (Stordahl)	1	0	1	0	0	0	1	X	3
United States (Thums) 🔨	0	1	0	1	1	2	0	X	5

Sheet C	1	2	3	4	5	6	7	8	Final
Switzerland (Décorvet) 🔨	1	0	0	1	0	1	0	X	3
Canada (Ideson)	0	2	2	0	1	0	1	X	6

Sheet D	1	2	3	4	5	6	7	8	Final
Sweden (Petersson-Dahl) 🔨	4	0	0	3	0	3	0	X	10
Slovakia (Ďuriš)	0	1	1	0	2	0	1	X	5

=== Draw 5 ===
Sunday, October 24, 19:05

Sheet A	1	2	3	4	5	6	7	8	Final
Sweden (Petersson-Dahl)	1	1	0	2	0	0	3	2	9
Italy (Menardi) 🔨	0	0	1	0	3	2	0	0	6

Sheet B	1	2	3	4	5	6	7	8	Final
Scotland (Nibloe) 🔨	1	1	0	0	1	1	0	2	6
South Korea (Jang)	0	0	3	3	0	0	2	0	8

Sheet C	1	2	3	4	5	6	7	8	Final
United States (Thums) 🔨	0	0	0	1	0	0	4	1	6
RCF (Kurokhtin)	1	1	1	0	2	2	0	0	7

Sheet D	1	2	3	4	5	6	7	8	Final
China (Wang)	0	0	1	0	0	1	0	X	2
Canada (Ideson) 🔨	0	0	0	2	1	0	1	X	4

=== Draw 6 ===
Monday, October 25, 9:05

Sheet A	1	2	3	4	5	6	7	8	Final
Slovakia (Ďuriš)	0	1	0	4	4	3	X	X	12
Switzerland (Décorvet) 🔨	0	0	1	0	0	0	X	X	1

Sheet B	1	2	3	4	5	6	7	8	Final
Canada (Ideson)	0	0	2	0	2	0	0	1	5
Sweden (Petersson-Dahl) 🔨	0	1	0	1	0	2	0	0	4

Sheet C	1	2	3	4	5	6	7	8	Final
Norway (Stordahl) 🔨	0	1	0	0	1	0	0	1	3
Latvia (Rožkova)	1	0	2	1	0	2	0	0	6

Sheet D	1	2	3	4	5	6	7	8	Final
South Korea (Jang) 🔨	0	0	0	0	0	2	X	X	2
United States (Thums)	0	1	2	3	2	0	X	X	8

=== Draw 7 ===
Monday, October 25, 14:05

Sheet A	1	2	3	4	5	6	7	8	Final
RCF (Kurokhtin)	0	1	1	0	0	0	2	4	8
Sweden (Petersson-Dahl) 🔨	0	0	0	0	0	2	0	0	2

Sheet B	1	2	3	4	5	6	7	8	Final
United States (Thums)	0	0	2	0	2	2	0	1	7
Italy (Menardi) 🔨	1	2	0	1	0	0	2	0	6

Sheet C	1	2	3	4	5	6	7	8	Final
South Korea (Jang)	0	1	1	0	0	0	X	X	2
China (Wang) 🔨	1	0	0	2	3	3	X	X	9

Sheet D	1	2	3	4	5	6	7	8	Final
Canada (Ideson)	0	1	0	1	0	2	0	X	4
Scotland (Nibloe) 🔨	1	0	2	0	2	0	2	X	7

=== Draw 8 ===
Monday, October 25, 19:05

Sheet A	1	2	3	4	5	6	7	8	Final
Italy (Menardi)	0	2	0	0	2	0	X	X	4
Norway (Stordahl) 🔨	3	0	2	2	0	4	X	X	11

Sheet B	1	2	3	4	5	6	7	8	Final
Latvia (Rožkova) 🔨	1	0	0	1	0	1	0	X	3
China (Wang)	0	1	1	0	2	0	3	X	7

Sheet C	1	2	3	4	5	6	7	8	Final
Scotland (Nibloe)	0	3	0	2	3	0	0	3	11
Switzerland (Décorvet) 🔨	1	0	1	0	0	1	4	0	7

Sheet D	1	2	3	4	5	6	7	8	Final
Slovakia (Ďuriš) 🔨	0	0	0	2	3	0	X	X	5
RCF (Kurokhtin)	5	1	3	0	0	5	X	X	14

=== Draw 9 ===
Tuesday, October 26, 9:05

Sheet A	1	2	3	4	5	6	7	8	Final
South Korea (Jang)	0	0	0	1	0	1	0	X	2
Slovakia (Ďuriš) 🔨	1	1	1	0	1	0	1	X	5

Sheet B	1	2	3	4	5	6	7	8	Final
Norway (Stordahl)	0	2	0	1	1	1	0	2	7
Canada (Ideson) 🔨	2	0	2	0	0	0	2	0	6

Sheet C	1	2	3	4	5	6	7	8	Final
Latvia (Rožkova) 🔨	0	1	4	0	1	0	0	X	6
Sweden (Petersson-Dahl)	2	0	0	1	0	4	1	X	8

Sheet D	1	2	3	4	5	6	7	8	Final
United States (Thums) 🔨	2	0	2	0	1	0	3	X	8
Switzerland (Décorvet)	0	2	0	1	0	3	0	X	6

=== Draw 10 ===
Tuesday, October 26, 14:05

Sheet A	1	2	3	4	5	6	7	8	Final
China (Wang) 🔨	3	0	0	0	1	0	1	1	6
United States (Thums)	0	0	2	1	0	1	0	0	4

Sheet B	1	2	3	4	5	6	7	8	Final
Scotland (Nibloe) 🔨	1	0	0	0	1	0	X	X	2
Sweden (Petersson-Dahl)	0	2	2	1	0	4	X	X	9

Sheet C	1	2	3	4	5	6	7	8	Final
Canada (Ideson) 🔨	0	0	1	0	0	4	1	0	6
RCF (Kurokhtin)	1	0	0	2	3	0	0	3	9

Sheet D	1	2	3	4	5	6	7	8	EE	Final
South Korea (Jang) 🔨	0	0	1	2	1	0	0	1	1	6
Italy (Menardi)	2	1	0	0	0	1	1	0	0	5

=== Draw 11 ===
Tuesday, October 26, 19:05

Sheet A	1	2	3	4	5	6	7	8	Final
Latvia (Rožkova)	1	0	0	0	0	0	X	X	1
Scotland (Nibloe) 🔨	0	2	1	1	2	4	X	X	10

Sheet B	1	2	3	4	5	6	7	8	Final
Switzerland (Décorvet) 🔨	0	1	0	0	1	0	0	X	2
China (Wang)	1	0	1	3	0	1	1	X	7

Sheet C	1	2	3	4	5	6	7	8	Final
Italy (Menardi) 🔨	2	1	2	1	0	2	0	X	8
Slovakia (Ďuriš)	0	0	0	0	0	0	1	X	1

Sheet D	1	2	3	4	5	6	7	8	Final
RCF (Kurokhtin)	0	0	3	0	0	2	1	0	6
Norway (Stordahl) 🔨	2	0	0	1	0	0	0	4	7

=== Draw 12 ===
Wednesday, October 27, 9:05

Sheet A	1	2	3	4	5	6	7	8	Final
South Korea (Jang)	0	0	2	0	0	0	X	X	2
Canada (Ideson) 🔨	1	1	0	2	1	3	X	X	8

Sheet B	1	2	3	4	5	6	7	8	Final
RCF (Kurokhtin) 🔨	1	0	1	1	0	2	3	X	8
Scotland (Nibloe)	0	1	0	0	3	0	0	X	4

Sheet C	1	2	3	4	5	6	7	8	Final
Sweden (Petersson-Dahl) 🔨	1	0	2	0	1	3	0	X	7
United States (Thums)	0	2	0	1	0	0	1	X	4

Sheet D	1	2	3	4	5	6	7	8	Final
Italy (Menardi)	0	0	1	0	0	1	X	X	2
China (Wang) 🔨	1	2	0	5	2	0	X	X	10

=== Draw 13 ===
Wednesday, October 27, 14:05

Sheet A	1	2	3	4	5	6	7	8	Final
Scotland (Nibloe) 🔨	0	1	0	0	0	1	1	0	3
China (Wang)	0	0	1	1	0	0	0	0	2

Sheet B	1	2	3	4	5	6	7	8	Final
Slovakia (Ďuriš)	0	2	0	0	0	2	2	X	6
Norway (Stordahl) 🔨	1	0	1	4	2	0	0	X	8

Sheet C	1	2	3	4	5	6	7	8	Final
RCF (Kurokhtin)	2	0	1	2	1	1	0	X	7
Italy (Menardi) 🔨	0	1	0	0	0	0	0	X	1

Sheet D	1	2	3	4	5	6	7	8	Final
Switzerland (Décorvet) 🔨	0	3	0	2	0	1	0	1	7
Latvia (Rožkova)	1	0	2	0	2	0	0	0	5

=== Draw 14 ===
Wednesday, October 27, 19:05

Sheet A	1	2	3	4	5	6	7	8	Final
United States (Thums) 🔨	1	3	1	1	3	0	X	X	9
Latvia (Rožkova)	0	0	0	0	0	2	X	X	2

Sheet B	1	2	3	4	5	6	7	8	Final
Sweden (Petersson-Dahl) 🔨	1	2	0	2	2	0	X	X	7
Switzerland (Décorvet)	0	0	1	0	0	1	X	X	2

Sheet C	1	2	3	4	5	6	7	8	Final
Slovakia (Ďuriš) 🔨	0	0	0	0	0	2	1	X	3
Canada (Ideson)	0	1	2	3	2	0	0	X	8

Sheet D	1	2	3	4	5	6	7	8	Final
Norway (Stordahl)	0	0	0	0	1	0	0	X	1
South Korea (Jang) 🔨	0	0	1	1	0	2	2	X	6

=== Draw 15 ===
Thursday, October 28, 9:05

Sheet A	1	2	3	4	5	6	7	8	Final
Switzerland (Décorvet)	0	0	0	0	0	0	X	X	0
RCF (Kurokhtin) 🔨	3	2	1	2	1	4	X	X	13

Sheet B	1	2	3	4	5	6	7	8	Final
Italy (Menardi)	0	0	0	1	1	1	0	0	3
Latvia (Rožkova) 🔨	2	1	0	0	0	0	1	1	5

Sheet C	1	2	3	4	5	6	7	8	EE	Final
China (Wang) 🔨	0	1	0	0	2	1	0	0	4	8
Norway (Stordahl)	0	0	1	2	0	0	0	1	0	4

Sheet D	1	2	3	4	5	6	7	8	Final
Scotland (Nibloe)	0	1	0	0	0	2	0	X	3
Slovakia (Ďuriš) 🔨	1	0	2	1	1	0	3	X	8

=== Draw 16 ===
Thursday, October 28, 14:05

Sheet A	1	2	3	4	5	6	7	8	Final
Norway (Stordahl) 🔨	1	0	0	0	0	1	0	X	2
Sweden (Petersson-Dahl)	0	1	3	1	2	0	2	X	9

Sheet B	1	2	3	4	5	6	7	8	Final
United States (Thums)	0	0	3	1	1	0	4	X	9
Slovakia (Ďuriš) 🔨	1	1	0	0	0	3	0	X	5

Sheet C	1	2	3	4	5	6	7	8	Final
Switzerland (Décorvet) 🔨	0	2	0	0	2	0	2	1	7
South Korea (Jang)	1	0	1	1	0	1	0	0	4

Sheet D	1	2	3	4	5	6	7	8	Final
Latvia (Rožkova)	0	0	0	1	0	1	0	X	2
Canada (Ideson) 🔨	0	1	1	0	1	0	3	X	6

=== Draw 17 ===
Thursday, October 28, 19:05

Sheet A	1	2	3	4	5	6	7	8	Final
Canada (Ideson)	0	1	0	0	2	0	3	1	7
Italy (Menardi) 🔨	1	0	2	1	0	2	0	0	6

Sheet B	1	2	3	4	5	6	7	8	Final
South Korea (Jang) 🔨	1	1	0	3	1	1	0	1	8
RCF (Kurokhtin)	0	0	1	0	0	0	3	0	4

Sheet C	1	2	3	4	5	6	7	8	Final
United States (Thums) 🔨	1	0	3	0	3	0	1	X	8
Scotland (Nibloe)	0	2	0	1	0	2	0	X	5

Sheet D	1	2	3	4	5	6	7	8	EE	Final
China (Wang)	1	0	2	0	1	0	0	0	2	6
Sweden (Petersson-Dahl) 🔨	0	1	0	1	0	0	1	1	0	4

== Playoffs ==
Qualification games
4	United States	6
5	Canada	4
3	Sweden	10
6	Scotland	0

Semifinals
1	China	8
4	United States	5
2	RCF	3
3	Sweden	12

Final
1	China	5
3	Sweden	3
Bronze medal game
4	United States	4
2	RCF	7

=== Qualification games ===
Friday, October 29, 11:05

Sheet B	1	2	3	4	5	6	7	8	Final
Sweden (Petersson-Dahl) 🔨	2	2	1	2	2	1	X	X	10
Scotland (Nibloe)	0	0	0	0	0	0	X	X	0

Sheet D	1	2	3	4	5	6	7	8	Final
United States (Thums) 🔨	0	2	0	1	0	1	0	2	6
Canada (Ideson)	0	0	1	0	1	0	2	0	4

=== Semifinals ===
Friday, October 29, 16:05

Sheet B	1	2	3	4	5	6	7	8	Final
China (Wang) 🔨	3	0	0	3	0	1	0	1	8
United States (Thums)	0	2	1	0	1	0	1	0	5

Sheet D	1	2	3	4	5	6	7	8	Final
RCF (Kurokhtin) 🔨	0	0	2	0	0	1	0	X	3
Sweden (Petersson-Dahl)	2	0	0	2	6	0	2	X	12

=== Bronze medal game ===
Saturday, October 30, 7:05

Sheet C	1	2	3	4	5	6	7	8	Final
United States (Thums) 🔨	1	0	0	1	0	2	0	0	4
RCF (Kurokhtin)	0	1	1	0	2	0	2	1	7

=== Final ===
Saturday, October 30, 11:35

Sheet C	1	2	3	4	5	6	7	8	EE	Final
China (Wang) 🔨	1	0	1	0	0	0	0	1	2	5
Sweden (Petersson-Dahl)	0	0	0	0	1	1	1	0	0	3

== Final standings ==
Key
Teams relegated to 2022 B Championship

Place	Country	W	L
1st place, gold medalist(s)	China	11	2
2nd place, silver medalist(s)	Sweden	10	4
3rd place, bronze medalist(s)	RCF	9	4
4	United States	9	5
5	Canada	7	5
6	Scotland	6	6
7	Norway	5	6
8	Latvia	4	7
9	South Korea	4	7
10	Slovakia	3	8
11	Italy	2	9
12	Switzerland	2	9

== See also ==
- 2020 World Wheelchair-B Curling Championship
