= Ole Fredrik Syversen =

Norwegian wheelchair curler

- Curler
- Born: 16 December 1971 (age 54); Fredrikstad, Norway

Curling career
- World Wheelchair Championship: 10 (2013, 2015, 2016, 2017, 2019, 2020, 2021, 2023, 2024, 2025)
- Paralympic: 3 (2018, 2022, 2026)
Medal record
Wheelchair curling
Representing Norway
Paralympic Games
Silver medal – second place	2018 PyeongChang	Mixed team
World Wheelchair Championship
Gold medal – first place	2017 Gangneung	Mixed team
Gold medal – first place	2024 Gangneung	Mixed team
Silver medal – second place	2016 Lucerne	Mixed team

Ole Fredrik Syversen (born 16 December 1971) is a Norwegian athlete who competed in Wheelchair curling at the 2018 Winter Paralympics, winning a silver medal. He also competed in Wheelchair curling at the 2022 Winter Paralympics.
