= Yun Hee-keong =

South Korean wheelchair curler (born 1967)

- Curler ♀
- Born: September 12, 1967 (age 59)

Team
- Curling club: Uijeongbu Rolling Stone

Curling career
- Member Association: South Korea
- World Wheelchair Championship: 1 (2025)
- Paralympic: 1 (2014)
Medal record
Wheelchair curling
World Wheelchair Championship
Silver medal – second place	2025 Stevenston	Mixed Team

Yun Hee-keong (Korean: 윤희경; born September 12, 1967) is a South Korean wheelchair curler.

She participated at the 2014 where South Korean team finished on ninth place.

== Life ==
Yun was born with a physical disability. Yun decided to enter the world of curling in 2008 and was scouted in the Uijeongbu disability curling team "Rollingstones" in 2011. She was selected to represent the national wheelchair curling team in 2021 as part of the team kyeonggido runbacks.

== Wheelchair curling teams and events ==
Season	Skip	Third	Second	Lead	Alternate	Coach	Events
2013–14	Kim Myung-jin	Kim Jong-pan	Seo Soon-seok	Kang Mi-suk	Yun Hee-keong	Ahn Jae-sung	WPG 2014 (9th)
2014–15	Kim Jong-pan	Seo Soon-seok	Jung Seung-won	Yun Hee-kyeong	Yang Hui-tae	Shin Kyung-yong	WWhCQ 2014 (4th)
2024–25	Lee Hyeon-chul	Nam Bong-kwang	Yang Hui-tae	Yun Hee-kyeong	Cha Jin-ho	Cho Yang-hyun	WWhCC 2025 (silver)
