= Jostein Stordahl =

Norwegian disabled sportsperson (born 1966)

- Curler
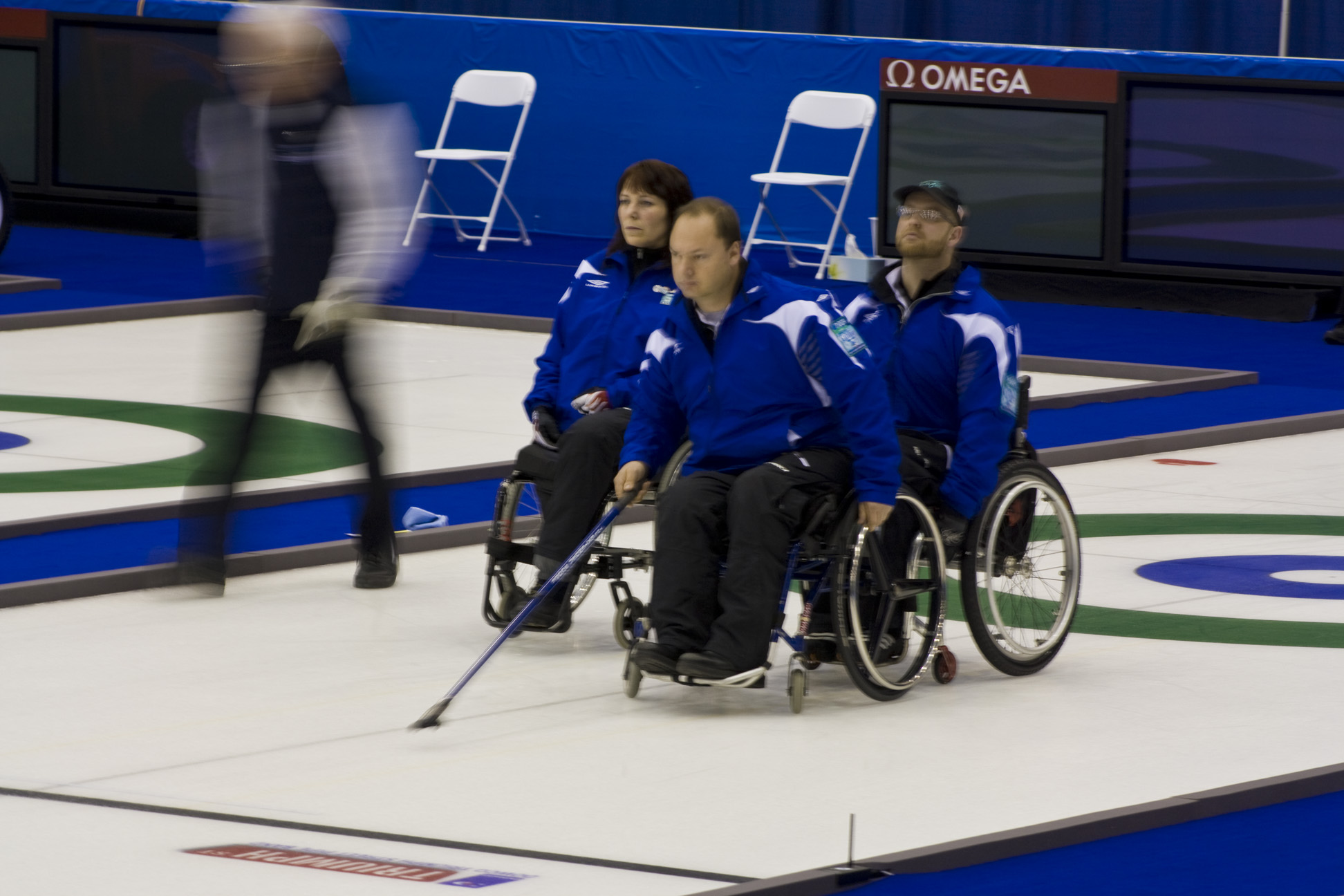
- Born: 20 May 1966 (age 60); Sarpsborg, Norway

Curling career
- World Wheelchair Championship: 14 (2007, 2009, 2011, 2012, 2013, 2015, 2016, 2017, 2019, 2020, 2021, 2023, 2024, 2025)
- Paralympic: 9 (1996, 2000, 2004, 2008, 2010, 2014, 2018, 2022, 2026)
Medal record
Representing Norway
Wheelchair curling
Paralympic Games
| Silver medal – second place | 2018 PyeongChang | Mixed team |
World Wheelchair Championship
| Gold medal – first place | 2007 Sollefteå | Mixed team |
| Gold medal – first place | 2008 Sursee | Mixed team |
| Gold medal – first place | 2017 Gangneung | Mixed team |
| Gold medal – first place | 2024 Gangneung | Mixed team |
| Silver medal – second place | 2016 Lucerne | Mixed team |
| Bronze medal – third place | 2011 Prague | Mixed team |
Sailing
World Championships
| Silver medal – second place | 2005 Sonderborg | Sonar |
| Bronze medal – third place | 2006 Perth | Sonar |

Jostein Stordahl (born 20 May 1966) is a Norwegian disabled sportsperson. He has competed in sailing and wheelchair curling at the Paralympic Games as well as at their respective World Championships.
