= Li Nana =

Chinese wheelchair curler (born 1987)

- Curler ♀
- Born: 14 December 1987 (age 38)

Curling career
- Member Association: China
- World Wheelchair Championship: 2 (2023, 2025)
- Paralympic: 1 (2026)
Medal record
Wheelchair curling
Representing China
Paralympic Games
Silver medal – second place	2026 Milano Cortina	Mixed team
World Championship
Gold medal – first place	2023 Richmond	Mixed team
Gold medal – first place	2025 Stevenston	Mixed team

Li Nana (Chinese: 李娜娜, born 14 December 1987) is a Chinese wheelchair curler. She represented China at the 2026 Winter Paralympics.

== Career ==
Li competed at the 2023 World Wheelchair Curling Championship where she served as the lead and won a gold medal She again won a gold medal at the 2025 World Wheelchair Curling Championship.

In February 2026, she was selected to represent China at the 2026 Winter Paralympics.
