= 2022 World Wheelchair-B Curling Championship =

- Host city: Lohja, Finland
- Arena: Kisakallio Sports Institute
- Dates: November 5–10
- Winner: Czech Republic
- Skip: Dana Selnekovičová
- Third: Martin Tluk
- Second: Milan Bartůněk
- Lead: Jana Břinčilová
- Alternate: Radek Musílek
- Coach: Sune Frederiksen
- Finalist: Denmark (Ørbæk)

The 2022 World Wheelchair-B Curling Championship was held from November 5 to 10 at the Kisakallio Sports Institute in Lohja, Finland. The top three placing teams (Czech Republic, Denmark and Germany) qualified for the 2023 World Wheelchair Curling Championship in Richmond, British Columbia, Canada.

== Teams ==
The teams are as follows:

Czech Republic	Denmark	England	Estonia
Skip: Dana Selnekovičová; Third: Martin Tluk; Second: Milan Bartůněk; Lead: Jana Břinčilová; Alternate: Radek Musílek	Skip: Kenneth Ørbæk; Third: Michaell Jensen; Second: Niels Nielsen; Lead: Sussie Nielsen	Skip: Rosemary Lenton; Third: Stephen McGarry; Second: Julian Mattison; Lead: Norma McGarry; Alternate: Jean Guild	Fourth: Mait Mätas; Skip: Andrei Koitmäe; Second: Lauri Murasov; Lead: Katlin Riidebach; Alternate: Signe Falkenberg
Finland	Germany	Hungary	Italy
Skip: Juha Rajala; Third: Harri Tuomaala; Second: Jouna Tähti; Lead: Valeriina Silas; Alternate: Ritva Lampinen	Skip: Burkhard Möller; Third: Christiane Putzich; Second: Christoph Gemmer; Lead: Heike Melchior	Fourth: Péter Barkóczi; Skip: Viktor Beke; Second: Anikó Sasadi; Lead: Rita Sárai	Skip: Egidio Marchese; Third: Fabrizio Bich; Second: Matteo Ronzani; Lead: Angela Menardi; Alternate: Orietta Berto
Japan	Kazakhstan	Poland	Switzerland
Skip: Takashi Sakataya; Third: Kazuhiro Kashiwabara; Second: Yoku Akazawa; Lead: Kana Matsuda; Alternate: Hiromi Takahashi	Skip: Rufik Tyncharov; Third: Anuar Zhakupov; Second: Mariya Sazhneva; Lead: Gulzhan Kazhynova	Skip: Michał Daszkowski; Third: Łukasz Waszek; Second: Dariusz Mikuła; Lead: Joanna Kozakiewicz; Alternate: Monika Bodych	Skip: Laurent Kneubühl; Third: Marcel Bodenmann; Second: Murad Mirza; Lead: Beatrix Blauel; Alternate: Stephanie Combremont

== Round-robin standings ==
Final round-robin standings

Key
Teams to Playoffs

Group A	Skip	W	L	W–L	DSC
Japan	Takashi Sakataya	5	0	–	98.97
Italy	Egidio Marchese	3	2	1–0	109.23
Switzerland	Laurent Kneubühl	3	2	0–1	103.97
England	Rosemary Lenton	2	3	–	110.02
Finland	Juha Rajala	1	4	1–0	112.53
Poland	Michał Daszkowski	1	4	0–1	103.68

Group B	Skip	W	L	W–L	DSC
Denmark	Kenneth Ørbæk	4	1	1–0	110.16
Czech Republic	Dana Selnekovičová	4	1	0–1	146.18
Germany	Burkhard Möller	3	2	–	113.72
Estonia	Andrei Koitmäe	2	3	1–0	127.34
Hungary	Viktor Beke	2	3	0–1	155.24
Kazakhstan	Rufik Tyncharov	0	5	–	195.50

Group A Round Robin Summary Table
Pos.	Country	England	Finland	Italy	Japan	Poland	Switzerland	Record
4	England	—	8–7	9–3	2–8	6–7	4–9	2–3
5	Finland	7–8	—	2–9	5–9	10–2	2–9	1–4
2	Italy	3–9	9–2	—	5–7	10–2	6–4	3–2
1	Japan	8–2	9–5	7–5	—	8–7	8–7	5–0
6	Poland	7–6	2–10	2–10	7–8	—	3–9	1–4
3	Switzerland	9–4	9–2	4–6	7–8	9–3	—	3–2

Group B Round Robin Summary Table
Pos.	Country	Czech Republic	Denmark	Estonia	Germany	Hungary	Kazakhstan	Record
2	Czech Republic	—	3–9	12–4	7–5	8–4	11–2	4–1
1	Denmark	9–3	—	8–6	7–6	2–9	12–1	4–1
4	Estonia	4–12	6–8	—	5–6	9–2	15–1	2–3
3	Germany	5–7	6–7	6–5	—	10–4	14–2	3–2
5	Hungary	4–8	9–2	2–9	4–10	—	14–2	2–3
6	Kazakhstan	2–11	1–12	1–15	2–14	2–14	—	0–5

== Round-robin results ==
All draw times are listed in Eastern European Summer Time (UTC+03:00).

=== Draw 1 ===
Saturday, November 5, 10:00

Sheet A	1	2	3	4	5	6	7	8	Final
Poland (Daszkowski) 🔨	1	1	2	0	1	0	0	2	7
England (Lenton)	0	0	0	1	0	4	1	0	6

Sheet B	1	2	3	4	5	6	7	8	EE	Final
Italy (Marchese)	0	0	1	0	1	0	2	1	0	5
Japan (Sakataya) 🔨	0	2	0	2	0	1	0	0	2	7

Sheet C	1	2	3	4	5	6	7	8	Final
Finland (Rajala) 🔨	1	0	0	0	0	1	0	X	2
Switzerland (Kneubühl)	0	3	1	1	2	0	2	X	9

=== Draw 2 ===
Saturday, November 5, 15:00

Sheet A	1	2	3	4	5	6	7	8	Final
Hungary (Beke)	1	1	0	0	0	0	0	X	2
Estonia (Koitmäe) 🔨	0	0	1	4	1	1	2	X	9

Sheet B	1	2	3	4	5	6	7	8	Final
Kazakhstan (Tyncharov)	0	0	0	0	1	0	0	X	1
Denmark (Ørbæk) 🔨	1	1	3	1	0	1	5	X	12

Sheet C	1	2	3	4	5	6	7	8	EE	Final
Czech Republic (Selnekovičová)	1	2	0	0	1	0	0	1	2	7
Germany (Möller) 🔨	0	0	2	0	0	2	1	0	0	5

=== Draw 3 ===
Sunday, November 6, 9:30

Sheet A	1	2	3	4	5	6	7	8	Final
Switzerland (Kneubühl) 🔨	0	3	0	0	0	1	0	0	4
Italy (Marchese)	1	0	1	1	1	0	1	1	6

Sheet B	1	2	3	4	5	6	7	8	EE	Final
Finland (Rajala) 🔨	0	0	0	1	0	4	1	1	0	7
England (Lenton)	1	1	2	0	3	0	0	0	1	8

Sheet C	1	2	3	4	5	6	7	8	Final
Poland (Daszkowski)	0	0	0	3	2	0	2	0	7
Japan (Sakataya) 🔨	2	2	1	0	0	2	0	1	8

=== Draw 4 ===
Sunday, November 6, 14:00

Sheet A	1	2	3	4	5	6	7	8	Final
Estonia (Koitmäe)	1	0	0	1	3	0	0	0	5
Germany (Möller) 🔨	0	1	1	0	0	1	1	2	6

Sheet B	1	2	3	4	5	6	7	8	Final
Denmark (Ørbæk) 🔨	2	1	1	0	1	2	1	1	9
Czech Republic (Selnekovičová)	0	0	0	3	0	0	0	0	3

Sheet C	1	2	3	4	5	6	7	8	Final
Kazakhstan (Tyncharov)	0	0	0	1	0	0	1	X	2
Hungary (Beke) 🔨	6	4	2	0	1	1	0	X	14

=== Draw 5 ===
Sunday, November 6, 18:30

Sheet A	1	2	3	4	5	6	7	8	Final
England (Lenton)	0	0	0	1	0	1	0	X	2
Japan (Sakataya) 🔨	3	2	1	0	1	0	1	X	8

Sheet B	1	2	3	4	5	6	7	8	Final
Switzerland (Kneubühl)	2	1	1	0	3	0	2	X	9
Poland (Daszkowski) 🔨	0	0	0	1	0	2	0	X	3

Sheet C	1	2	3	4	5	6	7	8	Final
Italy (Marchese) 🔨	1	0	1	1	0	5	1	X	9
Finland (Rajala)	0	1	0	0	1	0	0	X	2

=== Draw 6 ===
Monday, November 7, 10:00

Sheet A	1	2	3	4	5	6	7	8	Final
Germany (Möller) 🔨	2	0	0	0	2	0	1	1	6
Denmark (Ørbæk)	0	1	2	1	0	3	0	0	7

Sheet B	1	2	3	4	5	6	7	8	Final
Estonia (Koitmäe) 🔨	4	3	0	2	1	4	1	X	15
Kazakhstan (Tyncharov)	0	0	1	0	0	0	0	X	1

Sheet C	1	2	3	4	5	6	7	8	Final
Hungary (Beke)	0	1	0	2	0	1	0	0	4
Czech Republic (Selnekovičová) 🔨	1	0	2	0	1	0	2	2	8

=== Draw 7 ===
Monday, November 7, 15:00

Sheet A	1	2	3	4	5	6	7	8	Final
Finland (Rajala)	0	1	0	3	3	1	2	X	10
Poland (Daszkowski) 🔨	1	0	1	0	0	0	0	X	2

Sheet B	1	2	3	4	5	6	7	8	EE	Final
Japan (Sakataya)	0	0	3	0	2	0	2	0	1	8
Switzerland (Kneubühl) 🔨	2	1	0	1	0	1	0	2	0	7

Sheet C	1	2	3	4	5	6	7	8	Final
England (Lenton) 🔨	0	1	0	2	0	2	1	3	9
Italy (Marchese)	1	0	1	0	1	0	0	0	3

=== Draw 8 ===
Tuesday, November 8, 9:30

Sheet A	1	2	3	4	5	6	7	8	Final
Kazakhstan (Tyncharov)	0	0	0	2	0	0	0	X	2
Czech Republic (Selnekovičová) 🔨	1	2	1	0	1	3	3	X	11

Sheet B	1	2	3	4	5	6	7	8	Final
Germany (Möller)	2	1	0	4	1	2	0	X	10
Hungary (Beke) 🔨	0	0	1	0	0	0	3	X	4

Sheet C	1	2	3	4	5	6	7	8	Final
Denmark (Ørbæk) 🔨	1	1	0	1	0	3	0	2	8
Estonia (Koitmäe)	0	0	1	0	4	0	1	0	6

=== Draw 9 ===
Tuesday, November 8, 14:00

Sheet A	1	2	3	4	5	6	7	8	Final
Japan (Sakataya) 🔨	1	3	3	0	1	0	1	X	9
Finland (Rajala)	0	0	0	1	0	4	0	X	5

Sheet B	1	2	3	4	5	6	7	8	Final
Poland (Daszkowski)	0	0	2	0	0	0	0	X	2
Italy (Marchese) 🔨	1	2	0	1	2	2	2	X	10

Sheet C	1	2	3	4	5	6	7	8	Final
Switzerland (Kneubühl)	1	0	4	0	1	3	0	X	9
England (Lenton) 🔨	0	2	0	1	0	0	1	X	4

=== Draw 10 ===
Tuesday, November 8, 18:30

Sheet A	1	2	3	4	5	6	7	8	Final
Denmark (Ørbæk) 🔨	0	0	0	0	0	2	X	X	2
Hungary (Beke)	1	1	3	1	3	0	X	X	9

Sheet B	1	2	3	4	5	6	7	8	Final
Czech Republic (Selnekovičová) 🔨	0	2	2	3	0	0	5	X	12
Estonia (Koitmäe)	1	0	0	0	1	2	0	X	4

Sheet C	1	2	3	4	5	6	7	8	Final
Germany (Möller) 🔨	3	1	0	6	1	2	1	X	14
Kazakhstan (Tyncharov)	0	0	2	0	0	0	0	X	2

== Playoffs ==
Qualification games
B2	Czech Republic	10
A3	Switzerland	6
A2	Italy	2
B3	Germany	7

Semifinals
A1	Japan	3
B2	Czech Republic	6
B1	Denmark	8
B3	Germany	3

Final
B2	Czech Republic	7
B1	Denmark	3
Bronze medal game
A1	Japan	4
B3	Germany	5

=== Qualification games ===
Wednesday, November 9, 14:00

Sheet A	1	2	3	4	5	6	7	8	Final
Czech Republic (Selnekovičová) 🔨	0	0	3	2	1	0	2	2	10
Switzerland (Kneubühl)	2	1	0	0	0	3	0	0	6

Sheet C	1	2	3	4	5	6	7	8	Final
Italy (Marchese) 🔨	0	0	1	0	0	1	0	X	2
Germany (Möller)	1	1	0	0	1	0	4	X	7

=== Semifinals ===
Wednesday, November 9, 18:30

Sheet A	1	2	3	4	5	6	7	8	Final
Denmark (Ørbæk) 🔨	1	3	0	0	2	0	1	1	8
Germany (Möller)	0	0	1	1	0	1	0	0	3

Sheet C	1	2	3	4	5	6	7	8	Final
Japan (Sakataya) 🔨	1	0	1	0	1	0	0	X	3
Czech Republic (Selnekovičová)	0	3	0	0	0	2	1	X	6

=== Bronze medal game ===
Thursday, November 10, 10:00

Sheet B	1	2	3	4	5	6	7	8	Final
Japan (Sakataya) 🔨	0	0	1	0	2	0	1	0	4
Germany (Möller)	1	1	0	1	0	1	0	1	5

=== Final ===
Thursday, November 10, 15:00

Sheet B	1	2	3	4	5	6	7	8	Final
Czech Republic (Selnekovičová)	2	3	0	0	0	0	2	X	7
Denmark (Ørbæk) 🔨	0	0	0	1	1	1	0	X	3

== Final standings ==
Key
Teams Advance to the 2023 World Wheelchair Curling Championship

Place	Team
1st place, gold medalist(s)	Czech Republic
2nd place, silver medalist(s)	Denmark
3rd place, bronze medalist(s)	Germany
4	Japan
5	Italy
6	Switzerland

Place	Team
7	England
8	Estonia
9	Finland
10	Hungary
11	Poland
12	Kazakhstan
