= 2024 World Wheelchair-B Curling Championship =

- Host city: Lohja, Finland
- Arena: Kisakallio Sports Institute
- Dates: November 3–8
- Winner: United States
- Skip: Matthew Thums
- Third: Shawn Sadowski
- Second: Stephen Emt
- Lead: Batoyun Uranchimeg
- Alternate: Laura Dwyer
- Coach: Pete Annis
- Finalist: Japan (Kashiwabara)

The 2024 World Wheelchair-B Curling Championship is being held from November 3 to 8 at the Kisakallio Sports Institute in Lohja, Finland. The top three placing teams (United States, Japan, and England) will qualify for the 2025 World Wheelchair Curling Championship in Stevenston, Scotland.

== Teams ==
The teams are as follows:

Czech Republic	England	Estonia	Finland
Skip: Dana Selnekovičová; Third: Milan Bartuněk; Second: Martin Tluk; Lead: Eva Homolova; Alternate: Petr Pesek	Skip: Stewart Pimblett; Third: George Potts; Second: Julian Mattison; Lead: Karen Aspey; Alternate: Jason Kean	Skip: Ain Villau; Third: Mait Mätas; Second: Katlin Riidebach; Lead: Signe Falkenberg	Skip: Markku Karjalainen; Third: Sari Karjalainen; Second: Teemu Klasila; Lead: Pekka Palsynaho; Alternate: Vesa Leppänen
Hong Kong	Japan	Poland	Spain
Skip: Kin Ming Ming Chau; Third: Ho Tong Wong; Second: Kin Keung Wong; Lead: Yee Wah Chung; Alternate: Yuet Ming Choi	Fourth: Hiromi Takahashi; Skip: Kazuhiro Kashiwabara; Second: Tsutomu Iwata; Lead: Kana Matsuda; Alternate: Hiroki Kagami	Skip: Łukasz Waszek; Third: Michal Gasik-Daszkowski; Second: Monika Bodych; Lead: Joanna Kozakiewicz; Alternate: Agata Linde	Fourth: Anna Nadal Rodriguez; Third: Angel Pinyol Gomez; Skip: Bertrand Tramont; Lead: Nathalie Carpanedo Noireau
Switzerland	Thailand	United States	
Fourth: Hans Burgener; Skip: Konstantin Schmäh; Second: Pierre-Alain Tercier; Lead: Stephanie Combremont; Alternate: Beatrix Blauel	Skip: Preeyapa Dhevahudee; Third: Paitoon Pimpisan; Second: Watchara Ingsanthia; Lead: Singkhorn Thimdee; Alternate: Laphit Keawkalong	Skip: Matthew Thums; Third: Shawn Sadowski; Second: Stephen Emt; Lead: Batoyun Uranchimeg; Alternate: Laura Dwyer	

== Round robin standings ==
Final Round Robin Standings

Key
Teams to Playoffs

Country	Skip	W	L	W–L	DSC
United States	Matthew Thums	8	2	1–0	113.06
Japan	Kazuhiro Kashiwabara	8	2	0–1	118.48
Czech Republic	Dana Selnekovičová	7	3	–	120.21
England	Stewart Pimblett	6	4	2–0	116.13
Poland	Łukasz Waszek	6	4	1–1	147.81
Finland	Markku Karjalainen	6	4	0–2	133.56
Estonia	Ain Villau	5	5	1–0	122.67
Switzerland	Konstantin Schmäh	5	5	0–1	120.66
Spain	Bertrand Tramont	3	7	–	135.46
Hong Kong	Kin Ming Ming Chau	1	9	–	156.11
Thailand	Preeyapa Dhevahudee	0	10	–	146.89

Round Robin Summary Table
Pos.	Country	Czech Republic	England	Estonia	Finland	Hong Kong, China	Japan	Poland	Spain	Switzerland	Thailand	United States	Record
3	Czech Republic	—	9–4	7–9	4–9	16–2	5–4	8–5	11–1	5–3	13–2	3–7	7–3
4	England	4–9	—	7–9	7–4	12–0	2–5	10–0	13–8	L–W	17–0	6–3	6–4
7	Estonia	9–7	9–7	—	3–8	16–1	3–5	4–8	6–10	5–2	12–4	3–10	5–5
6	Finland	9–4	4–7	8–3	—	13–2	1–10	4–7	11–1	7–4	10–3	5–9	6–4
10	Hong Kong	2–16	0–12	1–16	2–13	—	2–11	1–16	4–12	2–11	11–5	2–15	1–9
2	Japan	4–6	5–2	5–3	10–1	11–2	—	15–3	13–1	8–2	17–1	5–7	8–2
5	Poland	5–8	0–10	8–4	7–4	16–1	3–15	—	8–4	10–4	8–1	0–10	6–4
9	Spain	1–11	8–13	10–6	1–11	12–4	1–13	4–8	—	0–14	7–5	4–12	3–7
8	Switzerland	3–5	W–L	2–5	4–7	11–2	2–8	4–10	14–0	—	9–3	7–2	5–5
11	Thailand	2–13	0–17	4–12	3–10	5–11	1–17	1–8	5–7	3–9	—	0–22	0–10
1	United States	7–3	3–6	10–3	9–5	15–2	7–5	10–0	12–4	2–7	22–0	—	8–2

== Round robin results ==
All draw times are listed in Eastern European Summer Time (UTC+03:00).

=== Draw 1 ===
Sunday, November 3, 9:30

Sheet B	1	2	3	4	5	6	7	8	Final
Switzerland (Schmäh)	0	1	0	1	0	1	0	X	3
Czech Republic (Selnekovičová) 🔨	1	0	1	0	1	0	2	X	5

Sheet C	1	2	3	4	5	6	7	8	Final
England (Pimblett) 🔨	0	2	2	1	3	2	X	X	10
Poland (Waszek)	0	0	0	0	0	0	X	X	0

Sheet D	1	2	3	4	5	6	7	8	Final
Estonia (Villau) 🔨	1	0	0	0	0	5	0	0	6
Spain (Tramont)	0	4	1	1	2	0	1	1	10

Sheet E	1	2	3	4	5	6	7	8	Final
Japan (Kashiwabara)	5	0	4	1	3	3	1	X	17
Thailand (Dhevahudee) 🔨	0	1	0	0	0	0	0	X	1

=== Draw 2 ===
Sunday, November 3, 14:00

Sheet B	1	2	3	4	5	6	7	8	Final
Hong Kong (Chau) 🔨	0	2	0	0	0	0	X	X	2
Finland (Karjalainen)	3	0	1	6	1	2	X	X	13

Sheet D	1	2	3	4	5	6	7	8	Final
Czech Republic (Selnekovičová) 🔨	2	1	0	0	1	0	1	1	6
Japan (Kashiwabara)	0	0	2	2	0	0	0	0	4

Sheet E	1	2	3	4	5	6	7	8	Final
Spain (Tramont) 🔨	2	0	2	0	0	0	X	X	4
United States (Thums)	0	4	0	2	5	1	X	X	12

=== Draw 3 ===
Sunday, November 3, 18:30

Sheet B	1	2	3	4	5	6	7	8	Final
United States (Thums) 🔨	0	5	1	3	0	1	X	X	10
Estonia (Villau)	1	0	0	0	2	0	X	X	3

Sheet C	1	2	3	4	5	6	7	8	Final
Switzerland (Schmäh) 🔨	0	2	3	1	3	0	0	X	9
Thailand (Dhevahudee)	1	0	0	0	0	1	1	X	3

Sheet D	1	2	3	4	5	6	7	8	Final
England (Pimblett) 🔨	1	0	1	0	2	1	2	0	7
Finland (Karjalainen)	0	1	0	2	0	0	0	1	4

Sheet E	1	2	3	4	5	6	7	8	Final
Poland (Waszek) 🔨	3	1	6	4	2	0	X	X	16
Hong Kong (Chau)	0	0	0	0	0	1	X	X	1

=== Draw 4 ===
Monday, November 4, 9:30

Sheet B	1	2	3	4	5	6	7	8	Final
Poland (Waszek) 🔨	3	1	1	1	1	1	0	X	8
Thailand (Dhevahudee)	0	0	0	0	0	0	1	X	1

Sheet C	1	2	3	4	5	6	7	8	Final
Estonia (Villau) 🔨	1	6	2	5	0	2	X	X	16
Hong Kong (Chau)	0	0	0	0	1	0	X	X	1

Sheet D	1	2	3	4	5	6	7	8	EE	Final
Switzerland (Schmäh)	0	0	2	0	0	1	0	1	0	W
England (Pimblett) 🔨	0	2	0	1	0	0	1	0	/	L

- England ran out of time in the extra end, therefore forfeiting the match.

=== Draw 5 ===
Monday, November 4, 14:00

Sheet B	1	2	3	4	5	6	7	8	Final
Japan (Kashiwabara) 🔨	0	2	0	1	1	2	2	X	8
Switzerland (Schmäh)	1	0	1	0	0	0	0	X	2

Sheet C	1	2	3	4	5	6	7	8	Final
Spain (Tramont)	0	0	1	0	0	0	X	X	1
Czech Republic (Selnekovičová) 🔨	2	2	0	1	4	2	X	X	11

Sheet D	1	2	3	4	5	6	7	8	Final
Thailand (Dhevahudee) 🔨	0	0	0	0	0	0	X	X	0
United States (Thums)	2	7	3	5	2	3	X	X	22

Sheet E	1	2	3	4	5	6	7	8	Final
Finland (Karjalainen) 🔨	0	1	2	1	2	1	1	X	8
Estonia (Villau)	3	0	0	0	0	0	0	X	3

=== Draw 6 ===
Monday, November 4, 18:30

Sheet B	1	2	3	4	5	6	7	8	Final
England (Pimblett)	1	0	1	3	0	0	0	1	6
United States (Thums) 🔨	0	1	0	0	1	1	0	0	3

Sheet C	1	2	3	4	5	6	7	8	Final
Finland (Karjalainen)	0	0	0	0	0	1	0	X	1
Japan (Kashiwabara) 🔨	1	1	1	1	2	0	4	X	10

Sheet D	1	2	3	4	5	6	7	8	Final
Poland (Waszek)	0	1	5	0	0	1	1	X	8
Spain (Tramont) 🔨	0	0	0	3	1	0	0	X	4

Sheet E	1	2	3	4	5	6	7	8	Final
Hong Kong (Chau) 🔨	1	0	1	0	0	0	X	X	2
Czech Republic (Selnekovičová)	0	5	0	7	2	2	X	X	16

=== Draw 7 ===
Tuesday, November 5, 9:30

Sheet B	1	2	3	4	5	6	7	8	Final
Finland (Karjalainen)	1	0	4	2	1	3	X	X	11
Spain (Tramont) 🔨	0	1	0	0	0	0	X	X	1

Sheet C	1	2	3	4	5	6	7	8	Final
Poland (Waszek)	0	0	0	0	0	0	X	X	0
United States (Thums) 🔨	2	3	1	1	0	3	X	X	10

Sheet D	1	2	3	4	5	6	7	8	Final
Hong Kong (Chau)	0	0	0	0	0	0	X	X	0
England (Pimblett) 🔨	2	1	3	1	2	3	X	X	12

=== Draw 8 ===
Tuesday, November 5, 14:00

Sheet B	1	2	3	4	5	6	7	8	Final
Czech Republic (Selnekovičová) 🔨	1	0	1	0	3	0	0	3	8
Poland (Waszek)	0	1	0	1	0	2	1	0	5

Sheet C	1	2	3	4	5	6	7	8	Final
Hong Kong (Chau) 🔨	0	2	0	3	1	5	0	X	11
Thailand (Dhevahudee)	2	0	1	0	0	0	2	X	5

Sheet D	1	2	3	4	5	6	7	8	Final
Estonia (Villau)	1	1	1	0	0	1	1	X	5
Switzerland (Schmäh) 🔨	0	0	0	1	1	0	0	X	2

Sheet E	1	2	3	4	5	6	7	8	Final
England (Pimblett) 🔨	0	0	1	0	1	0	0	0	2
Japan (Kashiwabara)	0	1	0	1	0	0	1	2	5

=== Draw 9 ===
Tuesday, November 5, 18:30

Sheet B	1	2	3	4	5	6	7	8	Final
Estonia (Villau) 🔨	1	1	0	0	1	0	0	X	3
Japan (Kashiwabara)	0	0	1	1	0	2	1	X	5

Sheet C	1	2	3	4	5	6	7	8	Final
Switzerland (Schmäh) 🔨	0	1	0	1	0	0	2	X	4
Finland (Karjalainen)	2	0	2	0	1	2	0	X	7

Sheet D	1	2	3	4	5	6	7	8	Final
United States (Thums)	0	1	1	1	0	0	2	2	7
Czech Republic (Selnekovičová) 🔨	1	0	0	0	1	1	0	0	3

Sheet E	1	2	3	4	5	6	7	8	Final
Thailand (Dhevahudee)	1	0	2	0	0	0	2	0	5
Spain (Tramont) 🔨	0	1	0	1	2	2	0	1	7

=== Draw 10 ===
Wednesday, November 6, 9:30

Sheet C	1	2	3	4	5	6	7	8	Final
Czech Republic (Selnekovičová) 🔨	3	0	1	0	2	1	0	0	7
Estonia (Villau)	0	5	0	1	0	0	1	2	9

Sheet D	1	2	3	4	5	6	7	8	Final
Spain (Tramont) 🔨	0	0	0	0	1	0	X	X	1
Japan (Kashiwabara)	1	3	5	1	0	3	X	X	13

Sheet E	1	2	3	4	5	6	7	8	Final
United States (Thums)	0	1	1	0	0	2	3	2	9
Finland (Karjalainen) 🔨	1	0	0	3	1	0	0	0	5

=== Draw 11 ===
Wednesday, November 6, 14:00

Sheet B	1	2	3	4	5	6	7	8	Final
United States (Thums) 🔨	1	1	0	4	3	1	5	X	15
Hong Kong (Chau)	0	0	2	0	0	0	0	X	2

Sheet C	1	2	3	4	5	6	7	8	Final
Thailand (Dhevahudee) 🔨	0	0	0	0	0	0	X	X	0
England (Pimblett)	3	2	3	5	2	2	X	X	17

Sheet D	1	2	3	4	5	6	7	8	Final
Finland (Karjalainen)	0	0	0	2	1	0	1	X	4
Poland (Waszek) 🔨	3	0	3	0	0	1	0	X	7

Sheet E	1	2	3	4	5	6	7	8	Final
Spain (Tramont)	0	0	0	0	0	0	X	X	0
Switzerland (Schmäh) 🔨	3	1	1	3	3	3	X	X	14

=== Draw 12 ===
Wednesday, November 6, 18:30

Sheet B	1	2	3	4	5	6	7	8	Final
Thailand (Dhevahudee)	0	0	0	1	0	0	3	X	4
Estonia (Villau) 🔨	1	5	2	0	3	1	0	X	12

Sheet C	1	2	3	4	5	6	7	8	Final
Japan (Kashiwabara) 🔨	2	2	2	0	5	4	X	X	15
Poland (Waszek)	0	0	0	3	0	0	X	X	3

Sheet D	1	2	3	4	5	6	7	8	Final
Switzerland (Schmäh)	4	0	3	1	2	0	1	X	11
Hong Kong (Chau) 🔨	0	1	0	0	0	1	0	X	2

Sheet E	1	2	3	4	5	6	7	8	Final
Czech Republic (Selnekovičová)	0	2	0	0	3	3	1	X	9
England (Pimblett) 🔨	0	0	3	1	0	0	0	X	4

=== Draw 13 ===
Thursday, November 7, 9:30

Sheet C	1	2	3	4	5	6	7	8	Final
United States (Thums)	0	2	0	0	0	0	0	X	2
Switzerland (Schmäh) 🔨	2	0	1	1	1	1	1	X	7

Sheet D	1	2	3	4	5	6	7	8	Final
Czech Republic (Selnekovičová)	2	5	2	1	0	0	3	X	13
Thailand (Dhevahudee) 🔨	0	0	0	0	1	1	0	X	2

Sheet E	1	2	3	4	5	6	7	8	Final
Japan (Kashiwabara) 🔨	3	4	3	0	1	0	0	X	11
Hong Kong (Chau)	0	0	0	1	0	1	0	X	2

=== Draw 14 ===
Thursday, November 7, 14:00

Sheet B	1	2	3	4	5	6	7	8	Final
Spain (Tramont) 🔨	0	0	4	4	0	0	0	0	8
England (Pimblett)	3	1	0	0	2	1	2	4	13

Sheet C	1	2	3	4	5	6	7	8	Final
Finland (Karjalainen)	0	0	0	3	5	0	1	X	9
Czech Republic (Selnekovičová) 🔨	1	0	1	0	0	2	0	X	4

Sheet D	1	2	3	4	5	6	7	8	Final
Japan (Kashiwabara) 🔨	1	0	0	0	1	2	1	0	5
United States (Thums)	0	2	2	1	0	0	0	2	7

Sheet E	1	2	3	4	5	6	7	8	Final
Estonia (Villau)	0	0	0	1	0	2	1	X	4
Poland (Waszek) 🔨	1	4	1	0	2	0	0	X	8

=== Draw 15 ===
Thursday, November 7, 18:30

Sheet B	1	2	3	4	5	6	7	8	Final
Poland (Waszek) 🔨	3	1	0	2	3	1	0	X	10
Switzerland (Schmäh)	0	0	3	0	0	0	1	X	4

Sheet C	1	2	3	4	5	6	7	8	Final
Hong Kong (Chau) 🔨	0	2	0	0	2	0	0	X	4
Spain (Tramont)	4	0	2	1	0	2	3	X	12

Sheet D	1	2	3	4	5	6	7	8	EE	Final
England (Pimblett)	0	1	5	1	0	0	0	0	0	7
Estonia (Villau) 🔨	1	0	0	0	3	1	1	1	2	9

Sheet E	1	2	3	4	5	6	7	8	Final
Thailand (Dhevahudee) 🔨	0	1	0	1	1	0	0	X	3
Finland (Karjalainen)	1	0	4	0	0	4	1	X	10

== Playoffs ==
Semifinals
1	United States	8
4	England	7
2	Japan	6
3	Czech Republic	5

Gold medal game
1	United States	9
2	Japan	4
Bronze medal game
4	England	7
3	Czech Republic	6

=== Semifinals ===
Friday, November 8, 9:30

Sheet A	1	2	3	4	5	6	7	8	Final
United States (Thums) 🔨	1	1	0	3	0	2	0	1	8
England (Pimblett)	0	0	3	0	1	0	3	0	7

Sheet D	1	2	3	4	5	6	7	8	EE	Final
Japan (Kashiwabara) 🔨	3	0	0	0	1	0	0	1	1	6
Czech Republic (Selnekovičová)	0	1	1	0	0	1	2	0	0	5

=== Bronze medal game ===
Friday, November 8, 15:30

Sheet C	1	2	3	4	5	6	7	8	Final
England (Pimblett)	0	0	3	0	2	1	0	1	7
Czech Republic (Selnekovičová) 🔨	0	3	0	2	0	0	1	0	6

=== Gold medal game ===
Friday, November 8, 15:30

Sheet B	1	2	3	4	5	6	7	8	Final
United States (Thums) 🔨	0	0	0	5	3	1	0	X	9
Japan (Kashiwabara)	0	1	1	0	0	0	2	X	4

== Final standings ==
Key
Teams Advance to the 2025 World Wheelchair Curling Championship

Place	Team
1st place, gold medalist(s)	United States
2nd place, silver medalist(s)	Japan
3rd place, bronze medalist(s)	England
4	Czech Republic
5	Poland
6	Finland

Place	Team
7	Estonia
8	Switzerland
9	Spain
10	Hong Kong
11	Thailand
