= Laura Dwyer =

American wheelchair curler (born 1977)

- Curler
- Born: August 9, 1977 (age 49); Oconomowoc, Wisconsin, U.S.

Curling career
- Member Association: United States
- World Wheelchair Championship: 3 (2023, 2024, 2025)
- World Wheelchair Mixed Doubles Championship: 1 (2025)
- Paralympic: 1 (2026)

Laura Dwyer (born August 9, 1977) is an American wheelchair curler. She represented the United States at the 2026 Winter Paralympics.

== Career ==
Dwyer competed at the 2024 World Wheelchair-B Curling Championship and won a gold medal.

In February 2026, she was selected to represent the United States at the 2026 Winter Paralympics.

At the 2026 Winter Paralympics in Milano Cortina, Dwyer competed in the inaugural mixed doubles wheelchair curling event alongside Steve Emt. The pair advanced to the semifinals and ultimately finished in fourth place.

== Personal life ==
In May 2012, Dwyer was doing her job as a landscaper when a 1,000-pound tree branch fell from 40 feet up, and left her with 26 broken ribs, three broken toes, and paralyzed from the waist down as a result of a spinal cord injury in her T12 and L1 vertebrae.
