= Lee Hyeon-chul =

South Korean wheelchair curler (born 1986)

- Curler
- Born: 6 February 1986 (age 40)

Curling career
- Member Association: South Korea
- World Wheelchair Championship: 3 (2023, 2024, 2025)
- Paralympic: 1 (2026)
Medal record
Wheelchair curling
Representing South Korea
World Championship
Silver medal – second place	2025 Stevenston	Mixed team

Lee Hyeon-chul (Korean: 이현출; born 6 February 1986) is a South Korean wheelchair curler. He represented South Korea at the 2026 Winter Paralympics.

== Career ==
Lee competed at the 2025 World Wheelchair Curling Championship and won a silver medal in the mixed team event, losing to China in the final.

In February 2026, he was selected to represent South Korea at the 2026 Winter Paralympics.
