= Steve Emt =

American wheelchair curler and Paralympian

- Curler
- Born: Stephen Emt; January 6, 1970 (age 56); Manchester, Connecticut, U.S.

Team
- Curling club: Madison CC, McFarland, WI

Curling career
- Member Association: United States
- World Wheelchair Championship: 6 (2015, 2016, 2017, 2019, 2024, 2025)
- World Wheelchair Mixed Doubles Championship: 1 (2025)
- Paralympic: 3 (2018, 2022, 2026)

Stephen Emt (born January 6, 1970) is an American wheelchair curler.

== Early life ==
Emt was born in Manchester, Connecticut and grew up in Hebron. He played basketball at West Point for two years, but dropped out after his father died of a heart attack. He enrolled at the University of Connecticut and walked on onto its basketball team, being a part of the 1994 team when they won the Big East regular season. In 1995, Emt was involved in a crash while drunk driving, resulting in him becoming paralyzed from the waist down.

== Career ==
Emt first took up curling in 2013 after being approached by a Paralympic recruiter on Cape Cod.

He represented the United States at the 2018 Winter Paralympics and 2022 Winter Paralympics, finishing in twelfth and fifth places respectively. At the 2026 Winter Paralympics in Milano Cortina, Emt competed in the inaugural mixed doubles wheelchair curling event alongside Laura Dwyer, where the pair reached the semifinals and ultimately finished in fourth place.

== Teams ==
Season	Skip	Third	Second	Lead	Alternate	Coach	Events
2014–15	Patrick McDonald	Stephen Emt	James Joseph	Penny Greely	Meghan Lino	Steve Brown	WWhCC 2015 (5th)
2015–16	Patrick McDonald	Steve Emt	James Joseph	Kirk Black			
2015–16	Patrick McDonald	Stephen Emt	James Joseph	Penny Greely	Justin Marshall	Steve Brown	WWhCC 2016 (6th)
2016–17	Stephen Emt	Kirk Black	Jimmy Joseph	Penny Greely	Justin Marshall	Steve Brown	WWhCC 2017 (7th)
2017–18	Kirk Black	Steve Emt	Justin Marshall	Penny Greely	Meghan Lino	Rusty Schieber, Tony Colacchio	WPG 2018 (12th)
2018–19	Steve Emt	Matt Thums	David Samsa	Pam Wilson	Meghan Lino	Rusty Schieber, Ann Swisshelm	WWhCC 2019 (11th)
2019–20	Stephen Emt	Matt Thums	David Samsa	Meghan Lino	Pam Wilson	Rusty Schieber	WhBCC 2019 (11th)
2023–24	Matt Thums	Shawn Sadowski	Steve Emt	Batoyun Uranchimeg	Laura Dwyer		WWhCC 2024 (9th)
2024–25	Matt Thums	Shawn Sadowski	Steve Emt	Batoyun Uranchimeg	Laura Dwyer		WhBCC 2024 (gold); WWhCC 2025 (11th)
