= Oyuna Uranchimeg =

American wheelchair curler

- Curler
- Born: Batoyun Uranchimeg; June 23, 1973 (age 53); Ulaanbaatar, Mongolia

Team
- Curling club: Chaska CC, Chaska, MN

Curling career
- World Wheelchair Championship: 3 (2021, 2024, 2025)
- Paralympic: 2 (2022, 2026)

Batoyun "Oyuna" Uranchimeg (born June 23, 1973) is an American wheelchair curler and administrative assistant at the University of St. Thomas.

== Early life ==
Uranchimeg was born in Ulaanbaatar, Mongolia. She was born and raised in Mongolia before visiting a friend in Minnesota in 2000. During her stay, she got into a car accident and became paralyzed from the waist down.

== Career ==
Following her accident, Uranchimeg became an Emerging Media Department's administrative assistant at the University of St. Thomas. She took up wheelchair curling in 2016 and became a member of the Four Seasons and Dakota Curling Club. While attending one the national team's training camps, Uranchimeg met Rusty Scheiber, the assistant coach of the national team, who encouraged her to pursue the sport. She joined the United States National Curling team in 2018 after successfully passing the pretrials.

In 2021, Uranchimeg helped the United States National Curling team win a gold medal at the World Wheelchair-B Curling Championship. Following this, Uranchimeg made her Paralympics debut at the 2022 Winter Paralympics.
