= Latvia at the 2016 Summer Paralympics =

- IPC code: LAT
- NPC: Latvian Paralympic Committee
- Website: www.lpkomiteja.lv (in Latvian)

in Rio de Janeiro
- Competitors: 11 in 6 sports
- Medals Ranked 45th: Gold 2 Silver 0 Bronze 2 Total 4

Summer Paralympics appearances (overview)
- 1992; 1996; 2000; 2004; 2008; 2012; 2016; 2020; 2024

Other related appearances
- Soviet Union (1988)

Latvia competed at the 2016 Summer Paralympics in Rio de Janeiro, Brazil, from 7 to 18 September 2016. They won four medals; two gold and two bronze. It was their most successful paralympic games to date.

== Disability classifications ==
Every participant at the Paralympics has their disability grouped into one of five disability categories; amputation, the condition may be congenital or sustained through injury or illness; cerebral palsy; wheelchair athletes, there is often overlap between this and other categories; visual impairment, including blindness; Les autres, any physical disability that does not fall strictly under one of the other categories, for example dwarfism or multiple sclerosis. Each Paralympic sport then has its own classifications, dependent upon the specific physical demands of competition. Events are given a code, made of numbers and letters, describing the type of event and classification of the athletes competing. Some sports, such as athletics, divide athletes by both the category and severity of their disabilities, other sports, for example swimming, group competitors from different categories together, the only separation being based on the severity of the disability.

== Medallists ==
Medal	Name	Sport	Event	Date
Gold	Aigars Apinis	Athletics	Men's discus throw F51/52	8 September
Gold	Diāna Dadzīte	Athletics	Women's javelin throw F515/56	10 September
Bronze	Edgars Bergs	Athletics	Men's shot put F35	12 September
Bronze	Diāna Dadzīte	Athletics	Women's discus throw F55	17 September

Medals by sport
Sport	Gold medal	Silver medal	Bronze medal	Total
Athletics	2	0	2	4
Total	2	0	2	4

== Archery ==
Latvia qualified one archer for the Rio Games following their performance at the 2015 World Archery Para Championships. Ieve Melle earned the spot in the women's recurve open after defeating Czech archer Marketa Sidkova in straight sets.

Athlete	Event	Ranking round		Round of 32	Round of 16	Quarterfinals	Semifinals	Finals	
Athlete	Event	Score	Seed	Opposition score	Opposition score	Opposition score	Opposition score	Opposition score	Rank
Gints Jonasts	Men's individual recurve open	541	32	Ranjbarkivaj (IRI); L 2–6	did not advance				17
Ieva Melle	Women's individual recurve open	592	12	Lee (TPE); W 6–5	Silva Carvalho (BRA); W 6–4	Olszewska (POL); L 0–6	did not advance		8
Gints Jonasts; Ieva Melle	Mixed team recurve open	1133	13	Bye	Airoldi / Mijno (ITA); L 0–6	did not advance			9

== Athletics ==
Athlete	Event	Heat		Final	
Athlete	Event	Result	Rank	Result	Rank
Aigars Apinis	Men's discus throw F52	—N/a		20.83	1st place, gold medalist(s)
Edgars Bergs	Men's shot put F35	—N/a		14.55	3rd place, bronze medalist(s)
Diāna Dadzīte	Women's discus throw F55	—N/a		22.66	3rd place, bronze medalist(s)
Diāna Dadzīte	Women's javelin throw F56	—N/a		23.26	1st place, gold medalist(s)
Taiga Kantāne	Women's discus throw F38	—N/a		23.53	11
Taiga Kantāne	Women's shot put F37	—N/a		8.78	7

== Equestrian ==
The country earned an individual slot via the Para Equestrian Individual Ranking List Allocation method.

Athlete	Horse	Event	Final	
Athlete	Horse	Event	Result	Rank
Rihards Snikus	King of the Dance	Individual Championship test grade Ia	73.174	6
Rihards Snikus	King of the Dance	Individual Freestyle test grade Ia	72.900	5

== Rowing ==
Athlete(s)	Event	Heats		Repechage		Final	
Athlete(s)	Event	Time	Rank	Time	Rank	Time	Rank
Eduards Pupelis; Žanna Cvečkovska	Mixed double sculls	4:36.95	6 R	4:41.33	5 FB	4:32.39	11

Eduards Pupels Qualification Legend: FA=Final A (medal); FB=Final B (non-medal); R=Repechage

== Swimming ==
Men

Athlete	Event	Heat		Final	
Athlete	Event	Result	Rank	Result	Rank
Jānis Plotnieks	100 m backstroke S10	1:07.96	11	did not advance	

== Wheelchair fencing ==
Women

Athlete	Event	Group stage			Quarterfinals	Semifinals	Final	
Athlete	Event	Opposition	Result	Rank	Opposition Result	Opposition Result	Opposition Result	Rank
Polina Rožkova	Individual épée A	Yevheniia Breus (UKR)	L 2–5	6	did not advance			
Polina Rožkova	Individual épée A	Yu Chui Yee (HKG)	W 5–2	6	did not advance			
Polina Rožkova	Individual épée A	Marta Fidrych (POL)	L 3–5	6	did not advance			
Polina Rožkova	Individual épée A	Veres Amarilla (HUN)	L 1–5	6	did not advance			
Polina Rožkova	Individual épée A	Bian Jing (CHN)	L 1–5	6	did not advance			

== In popular culture ==
On 15 November 2016 Latvijas Pasts issued three different postage stamps to commemorate the three Latvian medal winners of the 2016 Paralympics, which makes it the first time in Latvian history that paralympics are commemorated with a postage stamp issue.

== See also ==
- Latvia at the 2016 Summer Olympics
