= Athletics at the 2000 Summer Paralympics – Men's 100 metres T13 =

Men's 100 metres T13 at the XI Paralympic Games
- Venue: Stadium Australia
- Competitors: 16 from 13 nations

Medalists
| 1st place, gold medalist(s) | | Nathan Meyer | South Africa |
| 2nd place, silver medalist(s) | | André Andrade | Brazil |
| 3rd place, bronze medalist(s) | | Aldo Manganaro | Italy |

The Men's 100 metres T13 event for the 2000 Summer Paralympics took place at the Stadium Australia.

The T13 category is for athletes with a moderate visual impairment. Athletes in this category have a variety of visual impairments, but can typically recognize contours from a distance of 2 to 6 metres. Athletes in this category do not typically require a guide.

== Results ==
=== Semi-finals ===
Athletes qualified for the final if they finished in the top 3 in their race, or achieved one of the next 2 fastest times.

=== Heat 1 ===
| Rank | Athlete | Country | Time | Notes |
|---|---|---|---|---|
| 1 | Riaan Liebenberg | South Africa | 11.41 | Q |
| 2 | Kordian Galinski | Poland | 11.41 | Q |
| 3 | Trent Blair | United States | 11.52 | Q |
| 4 | Israel Hattingh | South Africa | 11.58 | |
| 5 | Ricardo Santana | Venezuela | 11.62 | |
| 6 | Kurt van Raefelghem | Belgium | 11.71 | |
| 7 | Jose Alves | Portugal | 11.85 | |
| 8 | Omal Al Rashidi | Saudi Arabia | 11.92 | |

=== Heat 2 ===
| Rank | Athlete | Country | Time | Notes |
|---|---|---|---|---|
| 1 | Nathan Meyer | South Africa | 11.23 | Q |
| 2 | André Andrade | Brazil | 11.39 | Q |
| 3 | Aldo Manganaro | Italy | 11.39 | Q |
| 4 | Aliaksandr Batsian | Belarus | 11.46 | q |
| 5 | Tadashi Hoshino | Japan | 11.53 | q |
| 6 | Armands Ližbovskis | Latvia | 11.58 | |
| 7 | Enrique Cepeda | Cuba | 11.67 | |
| 8 | Royal Mitchell | United States | 11.81 | |

=== Final ===
| Rank | Athlete | Country | Time | Notes |
|---|---|---|---|---|
| 1st place, gold medalist(s) | Nathan Meyer | South Africa | 11.36 | |
| 2nd place, silver medalist(s) | André Andrade | Brazil | 11.39 | |
| 3rd place, bronze medalist(s) | Aldo Manganaro | Italy | 11.46 | |
| 4 | Kordian Galinski | Poland | 11.47 | |
| 5 | Aliaksandr Batsian | Belarus | 11.55 | |
| 6 | Riaan Liebenberg | South Africa | 11.60 | |
| 7 | Trent Blair | United States | 11.60 | |
| 8 | Tadashi Hoshino | Japan | 11.68 | |
