= Latvia at the 2020 Summer Paralympics =

- IPC code: LAT
- NPC: Latvian Paralympic Committee
- Website: www.lpkomiteja.lv (in Latvian)

in Tokyo
- Competitors: 7 in 4 sports
- Flag bearers: Aigars Apinis and Ieva Melle (opening)
- Medals: Gold 0 Silver 3 Bronze 2 Total 5

Summer Paralympics appearances (overview)
- 1992; 1996; 2000; 2004; 2008; 2012; 2016; 2020; 2024

Other related appearances
- Soviet Union (1988)

Latvia competed at the 2020 Summer Paralympics in Tokyo, Japan, from 24 August to 5 September 2021.

== Medalists ==
| Medal | Name | Sport | Event | Date |
|---|---|---|---|---|
| Silver | Diāna Dadzīte | Athletics | Women's discus throw F55 | 27 August |
| Silver | Rihards Snikus on King Of The Dance | Equestrian | Individual championship test grade I | 27 August |
| Silver | Rihards Snikus on King Of The Dance | Equestrian | Individual freestyle test grade I | 30 August |
| Bronze | Aigars Apinis | Athletics | Men's discus throw F52 | 29 August |
| Bronze | Diāna Dadzīte | Athletics | Women's javelin throw F56 | 31 August |

== Competitors ==
| Sport | Men | Women | Total |
|---|---|---|---|
| Archery | 0 | 1 | 1 |
| Athletics | 2 | 2 | 4 |
| Equestrian | 1 | 0 | 1 |
| Swimming | 1 | 0 | 1 |
| Total | 4 | 3 | 7 |

== Archery ==
Women

| Athlete | Event | Ranking round | | Round of 32 | Round of 16 | Quarterfinals | Semifinals | Finals | |
| Athlete | Event | Score | Seed | Opposition score | Opposition score | Opposition score | Opposition score | Opposition score | Rank |
|---|---|---|---|---|---|---|---|---|---|
| Ieva Melle | Women's individual recurve open | 495 | 21 | Chaisty (GBR); L 3-7 | did not advance | | | | |

== Athletics ==
Two Latvian athlete (Aigars Apinis & Diāna Dadzīte) successfully to break through the qualifications for the 2020 Paralympics after breaking the qualification limit.

Men's field

| Athlete | Event | Final | |
| Athlete | Event | Result | Rank |
|---|---|---|---|
| Aigars Apinis | Discus throw F52 | 19.39 | 3rd place, bronze medalist(s) |
| Edgars Bergs | Shot put F35 | 14.70 | 5 |

Women's field

| Athlete | Event | Final | |
| Athlete | Event | Result | Rank |
|---|---|---|---|
| Diāna Dadzīte | Discus throw F55 | 25.02 | 2nd place, silver medalist(s) |
| Diāna Dadzīte | Javelin throw F56 | 24.22 | 3rd place, bronze medalist(s) |
| Baiba Rorbaha | Club throw F32 | 16.32 | 9 |

== Equestrian ==
Latvian sent one athlete after qualified.

Individual

| Athlete | Horse | Event | Total | |
| Athlete | Horse | Event | Score | Rank |
|---|---|---|---|---|
| Rihards Snikus | King Of The Dance | Individual championship test grade I | 80.179 | (silver) Q |
| Rihards Snikus | King Of The Dance | Individual freestyle test grade I | 82.087 | 2nd place, silver medalist(s) |

== Swimming ==
One Latvian swimmer has successfully entered the paralympic slot after breaking the MQS.

Men

| Athlete | Event | Heat | | Final | |
| Athlete | Event | Time | Rank | Time | Rank |
|---|---|---|---|---|---|
| Jurijs Semjonovs | 100 m backstroke S8 | 1:09.88 | =7 Q | 1:10.44 | 8 |

== See also ==
- Latvia at the 2020 Summer Olympics
