= Latvia at the Paralympics =

- IPC code: LAT
- NPC: Latvian Paralympic Committee
- Website: www.lpkomiteja.lv (in Latvian)
- Medals: Gold 8 Silver 8 Bronze 9 Total 25

Summer appearances
- 1992; 1996; 2000; 2004; 2008; 2012; 2016; 2020; 2024

Winter appearances
- 1994; 1998–2002; 2006; 2010–2018; 2022; 2026

Other related appearances
- Soviet Union (1988)

Latvia, following its independence from the Soviet Union, made its Paralympic Games début at the 1992 Summer Paralympics in Barcelona, with a delegation of two athletes (Armands Lizbovskis and Aldis Supulnieks) in track and field. It then sent Supulnieks as its sole representative to the 1994 Winter Paralympics, for its Winter Games début. (He competed in cross-country skiing.) Latvia has taken part in every subsequent edition of the Summer Paralympics, but missed the 1998 and 2002 Winter Games, appearing with a one-man delegation in 2006, before being absent again in 2010.

Latvians have won a total of 25 Paralympic medals, of which eight gold, eight silver and nine bronze.

The country obtained its first medals in 2000 in Sydney, when Aigars Apinis took bronze in both the discus and the shot put (F52 category). Latvia's third medal of the Sydney Games was also a bronze, through Armands Lizbovskis in the long jump (F13). These were Lizbovskis' third and last Games. In 2004, Apinis became Latvia's first Paralympic champion when he won the F52 discus event, establishing a new Paralympic record with a throw of 18.98m. At the same Games, Edgars Bergs took silver in the shot put and bronze in the discus (F35). In 2008, Apinis and Bergs were again Latvia's sole medal winners. The former won gold in the discus (with a world record throw of 20.47m) and silver in the shot put (F33/34/52), while the latter also won silver in the shot put (F35/36). Until, the 2016 Games, Apinis remained as Latvia's only Paralympic champion to date. On 11 March 2026, Latvia won the first medal in their Winter Paralympics history, with Poļina Rožkova and Agris Lasmans's bronze medal in the Mixed doubles curling.

== Medal tables ==
=== Medals by Summer Games ===
Games	Athletes	Gold	Silver	Bronze	Total	Rank
(Spain) 1992 Barcelona/Madrid	2	0	0	0	0	–
(United States) 1996 Atlanta	5	0	0	0	0	–
(Australia) 2000 Sydney	5	0	0	3	3	63
(Greece) 2004 Athens	7	1	1	1	3	52
(China) 2008 Beijing	18	1	2	0	3	45
(United Kingdom) 2012 London	8	1	1	0	2	47
(Brazil) 2016 Rio de Janeiro	11	2	0	2	4	45
(Japan) 2020 Tokyo	7	0	3	2	5	66
(France) 2024 Paris	8	3	1	0	4	36
(United States) 2028 Los Angeles	future event					
(Australia) 2032 Brisbane	future event					
Total		8	8	8	24	63

=== Medals by Winter Games ===
Games	Athletes	Gold	Silver	Bronze	Total	Rank
(Norway) 1994 Lillehammer	1	0	0	0	0	–
(Japan) 1998 Nagano	did not participate					
(United States) 2002 Salt Lake City	did not participate					
(Italy) 2006 Turin	1	0	0	0	0	–
(Canada) 2010 Vancouver	did not participate					
(Russia) 2014 Sochi	did not participate					
(South Korea) 2018 PyeongChang	did not participate					
(China) 2022 Beijing	5	0	0	0	0	–
(Italy) 2026 Milano Cortina	7	0	0	1	1	–
(France) 2030 French Alps	Future event					
(United States) 2034 Utah	Future event					
Total		0	0	0	0	–

== List of medalists ==
=== Summer Paralympics ===
Medal	Name	Games	Sport	Event
Bronze	Aigars Apinis	2000 Sydney	Athletics	Men's discus throw F52
Bronze	Armands Ližbovskis	2000 Sydney	Athletics	Men's long jump F13
Bronze	Aigars Apinis	2000 Sydney	Athletics	Men's shot put F52
Gold	Aigars Apinis	2004 Athens	Athletics	Men's discus throw F52
Silver	Edgars Bergs	2004 Athens	Athletics	Men's shot put F35
Bronze	Edgars Bergs	2004 Athens	Athletics	Men's discus throw F35
Gold	Aigars Apinis	2008 Beijing	Athletics	Men's discus throw F33/F34/F52
Silver	Aigars Apinis	2008 Beijing	Athletics	Men's shot put F33/F34/F52
Silver	Edgars Bergs	2008 Beijing	Athletics	Men's shot put F35/F36
Gold	Aigars Apinis	2012 London	Athletics	Men's shot put F52-53
Silver	Aigars Apinis	2012 London	Athletics	Men's discus throw F51-53
Gold	Aigars Apinis	2016 Rio de Janeiro	Athletics	Men's discus throw F51-52
Gold	Diāna Dadzīte	2016 Rio de Janeiro	Athletics	Women's javelin throw F55-56
Bronze	Edgars Bergs	2016 Rio de Janeiro	Athletics	Men's shot put F35
Bronze	Diāna Dadzīte	2016 Rio de Janeiro	Athletics	Women's discus throw F55
Silver	Diāna Dadzīte	2020 Tokyo	Athletics	Women's discus throw F55
Silver	Rihards Snikus on King Of The Dance	2020 Tokyo	Equestrian	Individual championship test grade I
Silver	Rihards Snikus on King Of The Dance	2020 Tokyo	Equestrian	Individual freestyle test grade I
Bronze	Aigars Apinis	2020 Tokyo	Athletics	Men's discus throw F52
Bronze	Diāna Dadzīte	2020 Tokyo	Athletics	Women's javelin throw F56
Gold	Diāna Dadzīte	2024 Paris	Athletics	Women's javelin throw F55-56
Gold	Rihards Snikus on King Of The Dance	2024 Paris	Equestrian	Individual championship test grade I
Gold	Rihards Snikus on King Of The Dance	2024 Paris	Equestrian	Individual freestyle test grade I
Silver	Aigars Apinis	2024 Paris	Athletics	Men's discus throw F52

=== Winter Paralympics ===
Medal	Name	Games	Sport	Event
Bronze	Poļina Rožkova; Agris Lasmans	2026 Milano Cortina	Wheelchair curling	Mixed doubles

== See also ==
- Latvia at the Olympics
