= Athletics at the 2000 Summer Paralympics – Men's 200 metres T13 =

Men's 200 metres T13 at the XI Paralympic Games
- Venue: Stadium Australia
- Competitors: 14 from 10 nations

Medalists
1st place, gold medalist(s)		Nathan Meyer	South Africa
2nd place, silver medalist(s)		Andre Andrade	Brazil
3rd place, bronze medalist(s)		Ricardo Santana	Venezuela

The men's 200 metres T13 took place in Stadium Australia.

There were two semifinals and one final. The T13 is for athletes who have a visual impairment.

== Semifinals ==
Qualified for final

=== Heat 1 ===
Rank	Athlete	Time	Notes
1	Nathan Meyer (RSA)	22.53	Q
2	Andre Andrade (BRA)	22.83	Q
3	Aldo Manganaro (ITA)	23.09	Q
4	Israel Hattingh (RSA)	23.20	Q
5	Royal Mitchell (USA)	23.21	Q
6	Aliaksandr Batsian (BLR)	23.45	
7	Jose Alves (POR)	23.68	

=== Heat 2 ===
Rank	Athlete	Time	Notes
1	Ricardo Santana (VEN)	23.02	Q
2	Armands Lizbovskis (LAT)	23.30	Q
3	Trent Blair (USA)	23.39	Q
4	Tadashi Hosino (JPN)	23.53	
5	Ruslan Aftakhov (RUS)	23.76	
6	Riaan Liebenberg (RSA)	23.76	
—	Ihar Fartunau (BLR)		DNS

== Final ==
Rank	Athlete	Time	Notes
1st place, gold medalist(s)	Nathan Meyer (RSA)	22.42	
2nd place, silver medalist(s)	Andre Andrade (BRA)	22.75	
3rd place, bronze medalist(s)	Ricardo Santana (VEN)	23.08	
4	Aldo Manganaro (ITA)	23.25	
5	Royal Mitchell (USA)	23.27	
6	Israel Hattingh (RSA)	23.35	
7	Armands Lizbovskis (LAT)	23.35	
8	Trent Blair (USA)	23.59	
