= Latvia at the 2012 Summer Paralympics =

- IPC code: LAT
- NPC: Latvian Paralympic Committee
- Website: www.lpkomiteja.lv (in Latvian)

in London
- Competitors: 8 in 3 sports
- Medals Ranked 47th: Gold 1 Silver 1 Bronze 0 Total 2

Summer Paralympics appearances (overview)
- 1992; 1996; 2000; 2004; 2008; 2012; 2016; 2020; 2024

Other related appearances
- Soviet Union (1988)

Latvia competed with eight competitors at the 2012 Summer Paralympics in London, United Kingdom from 29 August to 9 September 2012.

== Medallists ==
Medal	Name	Sport	Event	Date
Gold	Aigars Apinis	Athletics	Men's Shot Put F52-53	31 August
Silver	Aigars Apinis	Athletics	Men's Discus Throw F51-53	6 September

== Athletics ==
Men's Track and Road Events

Athlete	Event	Heat		Final	
Athlete	Event	Result	Rank	Result	Rank
Edgars Kļaviņš	200m T13	24.35	6	did not advance	

Men's Field Events

Athlete	Event	Distance	Points	Rank
Aigars Apinis	Shot Put F52-53	10.23	1039	1st place, gold medalist(s)
Aigars Apinis	Discus Throw F51-53	21.00	1010	2nd place, silver medalist(s)
Edgars Kļaviņš	Long Jump F13	5.57	—N/a	13
Andis Ozolnieks	Shot Put F46	13.45	—N/a	7
Dmitrijs Silovs	Long Jump F37-38	5.29	—N/a	9

Women's Field Events

Athlete	Event	Distance	Rank
Liene Gruzīte	Long Jump F37-38	3.40	12
Liene Gruzīte	Shot Put F37	7.83	10
Taiga Kantāne	Shot Put F37	9.21	8
Taiga Kantāne	Discus Throw F37	23.94	9

== Equestrian ==
Athlete	Horse	Event	Total	
Athlete	Horse	Event	Score	Rank
Rihards Snikus	Chardonnay	Individual Championship Ia	70.400	4
Rihards Snikus	Chardonnay	Individual Freestyle Ia	72.050	6

== Swimming ==
Men

Athletes	Event	Heat		Final	
Athletes	Event	Time	Rank	Time	Rank
Jānis Plotnieks	100m backstroke S10	1:03.82	8 Q	1:04.00	8

== See also ==
- Latvia at the 2012 Summer Olympics
