= Latvia at the 2004 Summer Paralympics =

- IPC code: LAT
- NPC: Latvian Paralympic Committee
- Website: www.lpkomiteja.lv (in Latvian)

in Athens
- Competitors: 7 in 1 sport
- Medals Ranked 52nd: Gold 1 Silver 1 Bronze 1 Total 3

Summer Paralympics appearances (overview)
- 1992; 1996; 2000; 2004; 2008; 2012; 2016; 2020; 2024

Other related appearances
- Soviet Union (1988)

Latvia participated in the XII Summer Paralympic Games in Athens, Greece.

== Medalists ==
Medal	Name	Sport	Event
Gold	Aigars Apinis	Athletics	Men's Discus throw F52
Silver	Edgars Bergs	Athletics	Men's Shot put F35
Bronze	Edgars Bergs	Athletics	Men's Discus throw F35

== Results by event ==
=== Athletics ===
==== Men's ====
Athlete	Class	Event	Final		
Athlete	Class	Event	Result	Points	Rank
Aigars Apinis	F52	Discus	18.98 PR	-	1st place, gold medalist(s)
Aigars Apinis	F52	Shot put	8.21	-	4
Edgars Bergs	F35	Discus	40.71	-	3rd place, bronze medalist(s)
Edgars Bergs	F35	Shot put	13.55	-	2nd place, silver medalist(s)
Andis Ozolnieks	F44/46	Discus	40.46	809	8
Andis Ozolnieks	F44/46	Shot put	13.59	868	10

==== Women's ====
Athlete	Class	Event	Final		
Athlete	Class	Event	Result	Points	Rank
Maija Emulova	F37	Discus	22.11	707	8
Maija Emulova	F37/38	Shot put	8.58	931	8
Sanita Lietniece	F35/36	Shot put	6.79	874	11
Sanita Lietniece	F35/36/38	Discus	15.29	767	12
Ingrida Priede	F35/36/38	Discus	27.42 WR	1073	7
Ingrida Priede	F37/38	Shot put	9.40	939	6
Ivita Strode	F42-46	Discus	22.87	1147	4
Ivita Strode	F42-46	Shot put	7.15	955	9

== See also ==
- 2004 Summer Paralympics
- Latvia at the 2004 Summer Olympics
