= Latvia at the 2024 Summer Paralympics =

- IPC code: LAT
- NPC: Latvian Paralympic Committee
- Website: www.lpkomiteja.lv (in Latvian)

in Paris, France August 28, 2024 – September 8, 2024
- Competitors: 8 in 5 sports
- Flag bearers: Diana Krumina; Rihards Snikus
- Medals Ranked 36th: Gold 3 Silver 1 Bronze 0 Total 4

Summer Paralympics appearances (overview)
- 1992; 1996; 2000; 2004; 2008; 2012; 2016; 2020; 2024

Other related appearances
- Soviet Union (1988)

Latvia competed at the 2024 Summer Paralympics in Paris, France, from 28 August to 8 September.

== Medalists ==
The following Latvian competitors won medals at the games. In the discipline sections below, the medalists' names are bolded.

Medal	Name	Sport	Event	Date
Gold	Diāna Krumina	Athletics	Women's javelin throw F56	3 September
Gold	Rihards Snikus	Equestrian	Individual championship test grade I	3 September
Gold	Rihards Snikus	Equestrian	Individual freestyle test grade I	7 September
Silver	Aigars Apinis	Athletics	Men's discus throw F52	1 September

== Competitors ==
The following is the list of number of competitors in the Games.

Sport	Men	Women	Total
Athletics	3	1	4
Cycling	1	0	1
Equestrian	1	0	1
Shooting	0	1	1
Swimming	1	0	1
Total	6	2	8

== Athletics ==
Latvian track and field athletes achieved quota places for the following events based on their results at the 2023 World Championships, 2024 World Championships, or through high performance allocation, as long as they meet the minimum entry standard (MES).

Key

- Note–Ranks given for track events are within the athlete's heat only
- **Q** = Qualified for the next round
- **q** = Qualified for the next round as a fastest loser or, in field events, by position without achieving the qualifying target
- **DQ** = Disqualified
- **PR** = Paralympic Record
- **AR** = Area (or continental) Record
- **NR** = National Record
- **SB** = Season's Best
- N/A = Round not applicable for the event
- Bye = Athlete not required to compete in round

Field events

Athlete	Event	Final	
Athlete	Event	Distance	Rank
Emils Dzilna	Men's shot put F12	15.60	5
Raivo Maksims	Men's shot put F46	11.63	10
Raivo Maksims	Men's javelin throw F46	47.54	8
**Aigars Apinis**	Men's discus throw F52	20.62 **SB**	2nd place, silver medalist(s)
**Diāna Krumina**	Women's discus throw F55	24.31	4
**Diāna Krumina**	Women's javelin throw F56	24.99 **PR**	1st place, gold medalist(s)

== Cycling ==
Latvia entered one male para-cyclist after finished the top eligible nation's at the 2022 UCI Nation's ranking allocation ranking.

Road

Athlete	Event	Time	Rank
Oskars Gailiss	Men's road race C4–5	–1 LAP	18
Oskars Gailiss	Men's time trial C4	44:30.48	13

Track

Athlete	Event	Qualification		Final / BM	
Athlete	Event	Time	Rank	Opposition Time	Rank
Oskars Gailiss	Men's time trial C4-5	1:14.160	23	Did not advance	
Oskars Gailiss	Men's pursuit C4	5:09.932	11	Did not advance	

Qualification Legend: QB=Final Bronze medal; QG=Final Gold medal; QF=Final

== Equestrian ==
Latvia entered one para-equestrian into the Paralympic equestrian competition, by virtue of the nations individual final world para dressage rankings.

Athlete	Horse	Event	Total	
Athlete	Horse	Event	Score	Rank
**Rihards Snikus**	King Of The Dance	Individual championship test grade I	79.167 **Q**	1st place, gold medalist(s)
**Rihards Snikus**	King Of The Dance	Individual freestyle test grade I	82.487	1st place, gold medalist(s)

== Shooting ==
Women

Athlete	Event	Qualification		Final	
Athlete	Event	Points	Rank	Points	Rank
Margita Kanopka	P2 – 10 m air pistol SH1	526-5x	16	Did not advance	

== Swimming ==
Athlete	Event	Heats		Final	
Athlete	Event	Time	Rank	Time	Rank
Jurijs Semjonovs	Men's 50 m freestyle S7	29.99	9	Did not advance	
Jurijs Semjonovs	Men's 100 m backstroke S7	1:14.68	5 **Q**	1:14.76	7
Jurijs Semjonovs	Men's 50 m butterfly S7	DSQ		Did not advance	
Jurijs Semjonovs	Men's 200 m individual medley SM7	2:50.52	9	Did not advance	

== See also ==
- Latvia at the 2024 Summer Olympics
- Latvia at the Paralympics
