= Latvia at the 2008 Summer Paralympics =

- IPC code: LAT
- NPC: Latvian Paralympic Committee
- Website: www.lpkomiteja.lv (in Latvian)

in Beijing
- Competitors: 18 in 4 sports
- Flag bearers: Edgars Bergs (opening); Aigars Apinis (closing)
- Medals Ranked 45th: Gold 1 Silver 2 Bronze 0 Total 3

Summer Paralympics appearances (overview)
- 1992; 1996; 2000; 2004; 2008; 2012; 2016; 2020; 2024

Other related appearances
- Soviet Union (1988)

Latvia competed at the 2008 Summer Paralympics in Beijing, People's Republic of China.

== Medallists ==
Medal	Name	Sport	Event
Gold	Aigars Apinis	Athletics	Men's discus throw F33/F34/F52
Silver	Aigars Apinis	Athletics	Men's shot put F33/F34/F52
Silver	Edgars Bergs	Athletics	Men's Shot put F35/F36

== Sports ==
=== Athletics ===
==== Men's field ====
Event	Athletes	Classification	Final	
Event	Athletes	Classification	Result	Rank
Discus throw	Aigars Apinis	F33/F34/F52	20.47 m WR	1st place, gold medalist(s)
Discus throw	Edgars Bergs	F35/F36	47.02 m SB	5
Shot put	Aigars Apinis	F33/F34/F52	10.02 m WR	2nd place, silver medalist(s)
Shot put	Edgars Bergs	F35/F36	15.54 m PB	2nd place, silver medalist(s)

==== Women's track ====
Athlete	Class	Event	Heats		Final	
Athlete	Class	Event	Result	Rank	Result	Rank
Liene Gruzīte	T37	100m	16.83	17	did not advance	

==== Women's field ====
Athlete	Class	Event	Final		
Athlete	Class	Event	Result	Points	Rank
Liene Gruzīte	F35-38	Javelin throw	19.17	807	15
Liene Gruzīte	F37-38	Shot put	7.66	747	18
Ingrīda Priede	F37-38	Discus throw	27.64	933	6
Ingrīda Priede	F37-38	Shot put	9.21	807	17

=== Judo ===
==== Men's ====
Athlete	Event	First Round	Quarterfinals	Semifinals	Repechage Round	Final/ Bronze medal contest
Athlete	Event	Opposition Result	Opposition Result	Opposition Result	Opposition Result	Opposition Result
Kaspars Biezais	-73 kg	Krieger (GER); L 0000-1001	did not advance			

=== Powerlifting ===
==== Men's ====
Athlete	Event	Result	Rank
Aigars Višņevskisk	48kg	122.5	9

=== Volleyball ===
The Latvian women's volleyball team didn't win any medals; they were 7th out of 8 teams.

==== Players ====
- Ināra Barkāne
- Una Dzalba
- Ivonna Gailīte
- Oksana Gromova
- Diāna Ivanova
- Olga Jegorova
- Irina Jermoļenko
- Līga Kārliete
- Mārīte Pudāne
- Nellija Rusiņa
- Linda Sila
- Žanna Škutāne

==== Tournament ====
Group B matches

7 September 2008; 21:00	Latvia (LAT)	0–3	China (CHN)	China Agricultural University Gymnasium
7 September 2008; 21:00	(4–25, 7–25, 16–25)			China Agricultural University Gymnasium

9 September 2008; 12:00	Lithuania (LTU)	3-1	Latvia (LAT)	China Agricultural University Gymnasium
9 September 2008; 12:00	(16–25, 25–16, 25–16, 25–19)			China Agricultural University Gymnasium

10 September 2008; 9:00	Latvia (LAT)	0–3	United States (USA)	China Agricultural University Gymnasium
10 September 2008; 9:00	(12–25, 17–25, 11–25)			China Agricultural University Gymnasium

5-8th Semifinals

12 September 2008; 13:00	Ukraine (UKR)	3-0	Latvia (LAT)	China Agricultural University Gymnasium
12 September 2008; 13:00	(25–10, 25–12, 25–13)			China Agricultural University Gymnasium

7-8th Classification

13 September 2008; 20:00	Latvia (LAT)	3-2	Japan (JPN)	China Agricultural University Gymnasium
13 September 2008; 20:00	(25–19, 20–25, 25–18, 19–25, 25–16)			China Agricultural University Gymnasium

== See also ==
- Latvia at the Paralympics
- Latvia at the 2008 Summer Olympics
