= Latvia at the 2022 Winter Paralympics =

- Flag of Latvia
- IPC code: LAT
- NPC: Latvian Paralympic Committee
- Website: www.lpkomiteja.lv (in Latvian)

in Beijing, China 4 March 2022 – 13 March 2022
- Competitors: 5 (4 men and 1 woman) in 1 sport
- Flag bearers: Ojārs Briedis; Poļina Rožkova
- Medals: Gold 0 Silver 0 Bronze 0 Total 0

Winter Paralympics appearances (overview)
- 1994; 1998–2002; 2006; 2010–2018; 2022; 2026

Other related appearances
- Soviet Union (1988)

Latvia competed at the 2022 Winter Paralympics in Beijing, China which took place between 4–13 March 2022.

== Competitors ==
The following is the list of number of competitors participating at the Games per sport/discipline.

Sport	Men	Women	Total
Wheelchair curling	4	1	5
Total	4	1	5

== Wheelchair curling ==
Latvia competed in wheelchair curling.

Summary

Athlete	Event	Round robin											Semifinal	Final / BM	
Athlete	Event	Opposition Result	Opposition Result	Opposition Result	Opposition Result	Opposition Result	Opposition Result	Opposition Result	Opposition Result	Opposition Result	Opposition Result	Rank	Opposition Result	Opposition Result	Rank
Poļina Rožkova; Sergejs Djačenko; Agris Lasmans; Ojārs Briedis; Aleksandrs Dimbovskis	Mixed tournament	KOR; W 8–4	CAN; L 3–10	SVK; W 8–4	EST; L 5–6	SWE; W 9–7	SUI; W 9–7	NOR; L 6–8	USA; L 7–8	GBR; L 4–8	CHN; L 2–9	9	did not advance		

Round robin

Final round-robin standings

Key
Teams to Playoffs

Country	Skip	W	L	W–L	PF	PA	EW	EL	BE	SE	S%	DSC
China	Wang Haitao	8	2	–	68	39	36	28	2	13	71%	122.32
Slovakia	Radoslav Ďuriš	7	3	2–0	65	57	40	33	1	16	65%	95.19
Sweden	Viljo Petersson-Dahl	7	3	1–1	66	52	37	35	3	18	68%	91.08
Canada	Mark Ideson	7	3	0–2	69	50	36	33	2	11	71%	95.29
United States	Matthew Thums	5	5	1–0	60	75	32	39	2	6	60%	70.98
South Korea	Go Seung-nam	5	5	0–1	64	59	35	37	0	11	64%	103.20
Norway	Jostein Stordahl	4	6	2–0	60	64	37	38	2	13	64%	107.82
Great Britain	Hugh Nibloe	4	6	1–1	67	56	37	36	0	16	62%	134.75
Latvia	Poļina Rožkova	4	6	0–2	61	71	40	32	0	18	63%	100.43
Estonia	Andrei Koitmäe	3	7	–	51	69	32	41	2	13	61%	106.21
Switzerland	Laurent Kneubühl	1	9	–	48	87	32	42	0	8	56%	109.27

Wheelchair curling round robin summary table
Pos.	Country	Canada	China	Estonia	Great Britain	Japan	Norway	Slovakia	South Korea	Sweden	Switzerland	United States	Record
4	Canada	—N/a	7–3	9–3	6–3	10–3	7–6	8–9	4–9	3–6	8–4	7–4	7–3
1	China	3–7	—	9–3	6–3	9–2	7–4	7–5	9–4	1–5	7–4	10–2	8–2
10	Estonia	3–9	3–9	—	5–10	6–5	8–3	6–7	2–5	4–6	8–6	6–9	3–7
8	Great Britain	3–6	3–6	10–5	—	8–4	5–7	3–7	6–8	4–6	15–1	10–6	4–6
9	Latvia	3–10	2–9	5–6	4–8	—	6–8	8–4	8–4	9–7	9–7	7–8	4–6
7	Norway	6–7	4–7	3–8	7–5	8–6	—	9–3	4–9	6–8	8–5	5–6	4–6
2	Slovakia	9–8	5–7	7–6	7–3	4–8	3–9	—	7–2	6–5	8–6	9–3	7–3
6	South Korea	9–4	4–9	5–2	8–6	4–8	9–4	2–7	—	10–4	7–8	6–7	5–5
3	Sweden	6–3	5–1	6–4	6–4	7–9	8–6	5–6	4–10	—	9–2	10–7	7–3
11	Switzerland	4–8	4–7	6–8	1–15	7–9	5–8	6–8	8–7	2–9	—	5–8	1–9
5	United States	4–7	2–10	9–6	6–10	8–7	6–5	3–9	7–6	7–10	8–5	—	5–5

Draw 2
Saturday, 5 March, 19:35

Sheet A	1	2	3	4	5	6	7	8	Final
Latvia (Rožkova)	1	0	3	1	0	2	1	X	8
South Korea (Go) 🔨	0	2	0	0	2	0	0	X	4

Draw 4
Sunday, 6 March, 14:35

Sheet C	1	2	3	4	5	6	7	8	Final
Canada (Ideson) 🔨	4	0	0	2	4	0	X	X	10
Latvia (Rožkova)	0	1	1	0	0	1	X	X	3

Draw 5
Sunday, 6 March, 19:35

Sheet D	1	2	3	4	5	6	7	8	Final
Slovakia (Ďuriš)	1	0	1	2	0	0	0	X	4
Latvia (Rožkova) 🔨	0	2	0	0	1	2	3	X	8

Draw 6
Monday, 7 March, 9:35

Sheet B	1	2	3	4	5	6	7	8	Final
Latvia (Rožkova) 🔨	0	0	1	1	1	2	0	0	5
Estonia (Koitmäe)	2	2	0	0	0	0	1	1	6

Draw 7
Monday, 7 March, 14:35

Sheet D	1	2	3	4	5	6	7	8	Final
Latvia (Rožkova)	3	1	0	1	0	3	0	1	9
Sweden (Petersson-Dahl) 🔨	0	0	2	0	2	0	3	0	7

Draw 9
Monday, 8 March, 9:35

Sheet B	1	2	3	4	5	6	7	8	Final
Switzerland (Kneubühl)	0	1	0	0	3	3	0	0	7
Latvia (Rožkova) 🔨	3	0	2	1	0	0	2	2	9

Draw 10
Tuesday, 8 March, 14:35

Sheet C	1	2	3	4	5	6	7	8	Final
Latvia (Rožkova) 🔨	2	0	0	1	2	0	1	0	6
Norway (Syversen)	0	0	2	0	0	3	0	3	8

Draw 14
Wednesday, 9 March, 19:35

Sheet C	1	2	3	4	5	6	7	8	Final
United States (Thums) 🔨	0	2	0	4	0	2	0	0	8
Latvia (Rožkova)	1	0	1	0	3	0	1	1	7

Draw 16
Thursday, 10 March, 14:35

Sheet C	1	2	3	4	5	6	7	8	Final
Great Britain (Nibloe)	1	3	0	3	1	0	0	X	8
Latvia (Briedis) 🔨	0	0	1	0	0	1	2	X	4

Draw 17
Thursday, 10 March, 19:35

Sheet A	1	2	3	4	5	6	7	8	Final
Latvia (Rožkova)	1	0	0	0	1	0	X	X	2
China (Wang) 🔨	0	2	1	3	0	3	X	X	9

== See also ==
- Latvia at the Paralympics
- Latvia at the 2022 Winter Olympics
