= Latvia at the 2006 Winter Paralympics =

- IPC code: LAT
- NPC: Latvian Paralympic Committee
- Website: www.lpkomiteja.lv (in Latvian)

in Turin
- Competitors: 1 in 1 sport
- Medals Ranked 20th: Gold 0 Silver 0 Bronze 0 Total 0

Winter Paralympics appearances (overview)
- 1994; 1998–2002; 2006; 2010–2018; 2022; 2026

Other related appearances
- Soviet Union (1988)

Latvia participated in the ninth Winter Paralympics in Turin, Italy.

Latvia entered one athlete in the following sport:

- Alpine skiing: 1 male

== Medalists ==
	(gold)	(silver)	(bronze)	Total
Latvia	0	0	0	0

== See also ==
- 2006 Winter Paralympics
- Latvia at the 2006 Winter Olympics
