= Latvia at the 1994 Winter Paralympics =

- IPC code: LAT
- NPC: Latvian Paralympic Committee
- Website: www.lpkomiteja.lv (in Latvian)

in Lillehammer
- Medals: Gold 0 Silver 0 Bronze 0 Total 0

Winter Paralympics appearances (overview)
- 1994; 1998–2002; 2006; 2010–2018; 2022; 2026

Other related appearances
- Soviet Union (1988)

Latvia participated in 1994 Winter Paralympics in Lillehammer, Norway.

== See also ==
- 1994 Winter Paralympics
- Latvia at the 1994 Winter Olympics
