= Latvia at the 1992 Summer Paralympics =

- IPC code: LAT
- NPC: Latvian Paralympic Committee
- Website: www.lpkomiteja.lv (in Latvian)

in Barcelona
- Competitors: 2
- Medals: Gold 0 Silver 0 Bronze 0 Total 0

Summer Paralympics appearances (overview)
- 1992; 1996; 2000; 2004; 2008; 2012; 2016; 2020; 2024

Other related appearances
- Soviet Union (1988)

Latvia participated in the IX Summer Paralympic Games in Barcelona, Spain.

== See also ==
- 1992 Summer Paralympics
- Latvia at the 1992 Summer Olympics
