= 2023 World Wheelchair-B Curling Championship =

- Host city: Lohja, Finland
- Arena: Kisakallio Sports Institute
- Dates: November 5–10
- Winner: Slovakia
- Skip: Peter Zaťko
- Third: Radoslav Ďuriš
- Second: Dušan Pitoňák
- Lead: Monika Kunkelová
- Alternate: Adrian Durcek
- Finalist: Estonia (Koitmäe)

The 2023 World Wheelchair-B Curling Championship was held from November 5 to 10 at the Kisakallio Sports Institute in Lohja, Finland. The top three placing teams qualified for the 2024 World Wheelchair Curling Championship in Gangneung, South Korea.

The Japanese team, skipped by Hiroshi Wachi, were forced to forfeit five games as they only had three players fit to play.

== Teams ==
The teams are as follows:

Brazil	Denmark	England	Estonia
Skip: Jerónimo Gabriel; Third: Gláuber Santos; Second: Yezza Sousa; Lead: Vilma Miranda; Alternate: Cláudio Magalhães; Coach: Tatiani Tamy Garcia	Skip: Kenneth Ørbæk; Third: Helle Schmidt; Second: Niels Nielsen; Lead: Thomas Pedersen	Skip: Stewart Pimblett; Third: Jason Kean; Second: Karen Aspey; Lead: Julian Mattison; Alternate: George Potts	Skip: Andrei Koitmäe; Third: Ain Villau; Second: Mait Mätas; Lead: Katlin Riidebach; Alternate: Signe Falkenberg
Finland	Italy	Japan	Poland
Skip: Juha Rajala; Third: Harri Tuomaala; Second: Yrjö Jääskeläinen; Lead: Valeriina Silas; Alternate: Tiia Tallgreen	Skip: Egidio Marchese; Third: Fabrizio Bich; Second: Matteo Ronzani; Lead: Orietta Berto; Alternate: Angela Menardi	Skip: Hiroshi Wachi; Third: Shuichi Iljima; Second: Ayako Saito; Lead: Hiroaki Osaki; Alternate: Yoshiko Iwasawa	Skip: Michał Daszkowski; Third: Łukasz Waszek; Second: Mariusz Włodarski; Lead: Joanna Kozakiewicz; Alternate: Monika Bodych
Slovakia	Spain	Switzerland	
Skip: Peter Zaťko; Third: Radoslav Ďuriš; Second: Dušan Pitoňák; Lead: Monika Kunkelová; Alternate: Adrian Durcek	Skip: Anna Rodríguez; Third: Ángel Gómez; Second: Bertrand Tramont; Lead: Nathalie Noireau; Alternate: Miguel García	Skip: Laurent Kneubühl; Third: Marcel Bodenmann; Second: Eric Décorvet; Lead: Beatrix Blauel; Alternate: Stephanie Combremont	

== Round robin standings ==
Final Round Robin Standings

Key
Teams to Playoffs

Country	Skip	W	L	W–L	PF	PA	EW	EL	BE	SE	DSC
Estonia	Andrei Koitmäe	8	2	2–0	72	52	36	32	1	14	146.67
Italy	Egidio Marchese	8	2	1–1	77	45	36	26	0	14	114.62
Slovakia	Peter Zaťko	8	2	0–2	70	40	40	25	1	22	116.27
Poland	Michał Daszkowski	7	3	–	77	60	42	31	0	20	152.26
Finland	Juha Rajala	6	4	1–0	72	46	42	34	1	21	105.27
Switzerland	Laurent Kneubühl	6	4	0–1	74	55	39	36	2	17	120.80
England	Stewart Pimblett	4	6	1–0	74	59	39	31	0	19	134.12
Denmark	Kenneth Ørbæk	4	6	0–1	62	70	36	34	0	18	133.43
Brazil	Jerónimo Gabriel	2	8	–	31	84	22	41	1	5	152.56
Spain	Anna Rodríguez	1	9	1–0	26	84	19	44	0	4	133.83
Japan	Hiroshi Wachi	1	9	0–1	9	48	8	25	0	2	157.64

Round Robin Summary Table
Pos.	Country	Brazil	Denmark	England	Estonia	Finland	Italy	Japan	Poland	Slovakia	Spain	Switzerland	Record
9	Brazil	—	5–9	4–10	5–9	1–9	1–10	W–L	3–9	1–10	7–6	4–12	2–8
8	Denmark	9–5	—	0–12	7–9	8–5	8–10	9–1	5–11	1–8	10–1	5–8	4–6
7	England	10–4	12–0	—	4–7	6–8	8–11	16–0	2–9	4–9	8–3	4–9	4–6
1	Estonia	9–5	9–7	7–4	—	7–6	8–4	W–L	6–8	11–6	9–4	6–8	8–2
5	Finland	9–1	5–8	8–6	6–7	—	6–4	11–0	7–8	5–6	10–3	5–3	6–4
2	Italy	10–1	10–8	11–8	4–8	4–6	—	W–L	11–3	5–4	14–1	8–6	8–2
11	Japan	L–W	1–9	0–16	L–W	0–11	L–W	—	5–4	L–W	L–W	3–8	1–9
4	Poland	9–3	11–5	9–2	8–6	8–7	3–11	4–5	—	5–11	9–2	11–8	7–3
3	Slovakia	10–1	8–1	9–4	6–11	6–5	4–5	W–L	11–5	—	10–3	6–5	8–2
10	Spain	6–7	1–10	3–8	4–9	3–10	1–14	W–L	2–9	3–10	—	3–7	1–9
6	Switzerland	12–4	8–5	9–4	8–6	3–5	6–8	8–3	8–11	5–6	7–3	—	6–4

== Round robin results ==
All draw times are listed in Eastern European Summer Time (UTC+03:00).

=== Draw 1 ===
Sunday, November 5, 9:30

Sheet A	1	2	3	4	5	6	7	8	Final
Poland (Daszkowski) 🔨	1	0	0	3	0	1	1	2	8
Finland (Rajala)	0	2	2	0	3	0	0	0	7

Sheet B	1	2	3	4	5	6	7	8	Final
Japan (Wachi) 🔨	0	0	0	0	0	0	X	X	0
England (Pimblett)	4	1	3	6	1	1	X	X	16

Sheet C	1	2	3	4	5	6	7	8	Final
Italy (Marchese) 🔨	3	2	3	0	4	2	X	X	14
Spain (Rodríguez)	0	0	0	1	0	0	X	X	1

Sheet D	1	2	3	4	5	6	7	8	Final
Estonia (Koitmäe)	0	1	0	0	5	1	0	2	9
Denmark (Ørbæk) 🔨	1	0	1	4	0	0	1	0	7

=== Draw 2 ===
Sunday, November 5, 14:00

Sheet A	1	2	3	4	5	6	7	8	Final
Slovakia (Zaťko)	0	2	0	1	1	0	1	1	6
Switzerland (Kneubühl) 🔨	1	0	2	0	0	2	0	0	5

Sheet C	1	2	3	4	5	6	7	8	Final
Finland (Rajala) 🔨	2	1	0	2	0	0	0	1	6
Estonia (Koitmäe)	0	0	2	0	1	1	3	0	7

Sheet D	1	2	3	4	5	6	7	8	Final
Spain (Rodríguez)	0	2	0	0	3	1	0	0	6
Brazil (Gabriel) 🔨	1	0	3	1	0	0	1	1	7

=== Draw 3 ===
Sunday, November 5, 18:30

Sheet A	1	2	3	4	5	6	7	8	Final
Brazil (Gabriel)	0	1	0	0	0	0	0	X	1
Italy (Marchese) 🔨	2	0	2	1	0	2	3	X	10

Sheet B	1	2	3	4	5	6	7	8	Final
Poland (Daszkowski) 🔨	0	1	0	2	0	4	4	X	11
Denmark (Ørbæk)	2	0	2	0	1	0	0	X	5

Sheet C	1	2	3	4	5	6	7	8	Final
Japan (Wachi) 🔨	0	1	0	0	0	2	0	X	3
Switzerland (Kneubühl)	1	0	2	2	2	0	1	X	8

Sheet D	1	2	3	4	5	6	7	8	Final
England (Pimblett) 🔨	1	0	0	2	0	0	1	X	4
Slovakia (Zaťko)	0	2	4	0	2	1	0	X	9

=== Draw 4 ===
Monday, November 6, 9:30

Sheet A	1	2	3	4	5	6	7	8	Final
England (Pimblett) 🔨	1	1	3	4	2	1	X	X	12
Denmark (Ørbæk)	0	0	0	0	0	0	X	X	0

Sheet B	1	2	3	4	5	6	7	8	Final
Italy (Marchese) 🔨	0	1	1	0	0	1	0	2	5
Slovakia (Zaťko)	1	0	0	0	2	0	1	0	4

Sheet D	1	2	3	4	5	6	7	8	Final
Poland (Daszkowski)	2	0	1	0	0	1	0	0	4
Japan (Wachi) 🔨	0	1	0	1	1	0	1	1	5

=== Draw 5 ===
Monday, November 6, 14:00

Sheet A	1	2	3	4	5	6	7	8	EE	Final
Estonia (Koitmäe)	1	1	0	0	1	0	3	0	0	6
Poland (Daszkowski) 🔨	0	0	2	1	0	2	0	1	2	8

Sheet B	1	2	3	4	5	6	7	8	Final
Spain (Rodríguez)	1	0	0	1	0	1	0	X	3
Finland (Rajala) 🔨	0	3	3	0	1	0	3	X	10

Sheet C	1	2	3	4	5	6	7	8	Final
Denmark (Ørbæk)	3	2	0	2	0	2	0	X	9
Brazil (Gabriel) 🔨	0	0	1	0	2	0	2	X	5

Sheet D	1	2	3	4	5	6	7	8	Final
Switzerland (Kneubühl)	0	0	1	2	2	1	0	0	6
Italy (Marchese) 🔨	1	1	0	0	0	0	4	2	8

=== Draw 6 ===
Monday, November 6, 18:30

Sheet A	Final
Japan (Wachi) 🔨	L
Brazil (Gabriel)	W

Sheet B	1	2	3	4	5	6	7	8	EE	Final
Switzerland (Kneubühl)	1	0	2	0	0	2	0	1	2	8
Estonia (Koitmäe) 🔨	0	2	0	1	1	0	2	0	0	6

Sheet C	1	2	3	4	5	6	7	8	Final
England (Pimblett)	0	2	2	0	2	0	2	X	8
Spain (Rodríguez) 🔨	1	0	0	1	0	1	0	X	3

Sheet D	1	2	3	4	5	6	7	8	EE	Final
Slovakia (Zaťko) 🔨	0	1	1	0	2	0	1	0	1	6
Finland (Rajala)	1	0	0	1	0	2	0	1	0	5

=== Draw 7 ===
Tuesday, November 7, 9:30

Sheet A	1	2	3	4	5	6	7	8	Final
Switzerland (Kneubühl)	0	2	1	0	3	0	1	X	7
Spain (Rodríguez) 🔨	1	0	0	1	0	1	0	X	3

Sheet B	1	2	3	4	5	6	7	8	Final
England (Pimblett) 🔨	5	1	3	0	1	0	0	X	10
Brazil (Gabriel)	0	0	0	1	0	2	1	X	4

Sheet C	Final
Slovakia (Zaťko) 🔨	W
Japan (Wachi)	L

=== Draw 8 ===
Tuesday, November 7, 14:00

Sheet A	1	2	3	4	5	6	7	8	EE	Final
Finland (Rajala)	0	4	1	0	0	0	1	0	2	8
England (Pimblett) 🔨	1	0	0	1	2	1	0	1	0	6

Sheet B	1	2	3	4	5	6	7	8	Final
Slovakia (Zaťko) 🔨	2	1	2	1	2	0	X	X	8
Denmark (Ørbæk)	0	0	0	0	0	1	X	X	1

Sheet C	1	2	3	4	5	6	7	8	Final
Italy (Marchese) 🔨	2	2	1	3	0	3	X	X	11
Poland (Daszkowski)	0	0	0	0	3	0	X	X	3

Sheet D	Final
Japan (Wachi)	L
Estonia (Koitmäe) 🔨	W

=== Draw 9 ===
Tuesday, November 7, 18:30

Sheet A	1	2	3	4	5	6	7	8	Final
Italy (Marchese)	0	1	0	2	0	1	0	X	4
Estonia (Koitmäe) 🔨	1	0	4	0	3	0	0	X	8

Sheet B	1	2	3	4	5	6	7	8	EE	Final
Poland (Daszkowski)	1	0	4	0	2	1	0	0	3	11
Switzerland (Kneubühl) 🔨	0	3	0	2	0	0	0	3	0	8

Sheet C	1	2	3	4	5	6	7	8	Final
Brazil (Gabriel)	0	0	0	1	0	0	0	X	1
Finland (Rajala) 🔨	1	3	1	0	1	1	2	X	9

Sheet D	1	2	3	4	5	6	7	8	Final
Denmark (Ørbæk)	1	0	2	2	3	1	1	X	10
Spain (Rodríguez) 🔨	0	1	0	0	0	0	0	X	1

=== Draw 10 ===
Wednesday, November 8, 9:30

Sheet B	1	2	3	4	5	6	7	8	Final
Finland (Rajala) 🔨	3	0	1	1	1	0	0	X	6
Italy (Marchese)	0	1	0	0	0	2	1	X	4

Sheet C	1	2	3	4	5	6	7	8	Final
Spain (Rodríguez)	0	0	0	3	1	0	0	X	4
Estonia (Koitmäe) 🔨	3	1	2	0	0	2	1	X	9

Sheet D	1	2	3	4	5	6	7	8	Final
Brazil (Gabriel)	1	0	0	0	1	2	0	X	4
Switzerland (Kneubühl) 🔨	0	4	4	1	0	0	3	X	12

=== Draw 11 ===
Wednesday, November 8, 14:00

Sheet A	1	2	3	4	5	6	7	8	Final
Brazil (Gabriel) 🔨	0	0	0	0	0	1	0	X	1
Slovakia (Zaťko)	2	2	2	1	2	0	1	X	10

Sheet B	1	2	3	4	5	6	7	8	Final
Denmark (Ørbæk) 🔨	2	2	2	2	0	1	X	X	9
Japan (Wachi)	0	0	0	0	1	0	X	X	1

Sheet C	1	2	3	4	5	6	7	8	Final
Switzerland (Kneubühl)	2	1	4	0	0	2	0	X	9
England (Pimblett) 🔨	0	0	0	1	2	0	1	X	4

Sheet D	1	2	3	4	5	6	7	8	Final
Spain (Rodríguez) 🔨	0	0	0	0	0	2	0	X	2
Poland (Daszkowski)	3	1	1	2	1	0	1	X	9

=== Draw 12 ===
Wednesday, November 8, 18:30

Sheet A	1	2	3	4	5	6	7	8	Final
Denmark (Ørbæk) 🔨	1	3	0	1	2	0	1	0	8
Italy (Marchese)	0	0	3	0	0	3	0	4	10

Sheet B	1	2	3	4	5	6	7	8	Final
Estonia (Koitmäe)	0	2	0	3	1	0	1	X	7
England (Pimblett) 🔨	1	0	2	0	0	1	0	X	4

Sheet C	1	2	3	4	5	6	7	8	Final
Poland (Daszkowski) 🔨	1	0	2	2	0	0	0	X	5
Slovakia (Zaťko)	0	3	0	0	5	1	2	X	11

Sheet D	1	2	3	4	5	6	7	8	Final
Finland (Rajala)	1	3	1	1	3	2	X	X	11
Japan (Wachi) 🔨	0	0	0	0	0	0	X	X	0

=== Draw 13 ===
Thursday, November 9, 9:30

Sheet A	Final
Spain (Rodríguez) 🔨	W
Japan (Wachi)	L

Sheet B	1	2	3	4	5	6	7	8	Final
Brazil (Gabriel) 🔨	0	0	1	0	0	2	0	X	3
Poland (Daszkowski)	2	1	0	1	2	0	3	X	9

Sheet C	1	2	3	4	5	6	7	8	Final
Finland (Rajala)	0	0	2	1	2	0	0	0	5
Denmark (Ørbæk) 🔨	1	1	0	0	0	2	2	2	8

Sheet D	1	2	3	4	5	6	7	8	Final
Estonia (Koitmäe)	4	2	3	0	0	0	2	X	11
Slovakia (Zaťko) 🔨	0	0	0	2	3	1	0	X	6

=== Draw 14 ===
Thursday, November 9, 14:00

Sheet B	1	2	3	4	5	6	7	8	Final
Switzerland (Kneubühl) 🔨	1	0	1	1	0	0	0	0	3
Finland (Rajala)	0	1	0	0	0	2	1	1	5

Sheet C	1	2	3	4	5	6	7	8	Final
Estonia (Koitmäe) 🔨	2	2	0	4	0	1	0	X	9
Brazil (Gabriel)	0	0	1	0	3	0	1	X	5

Sheet D	1	2	3	4	5	6	7	8	Final
Italy (Marchese) 🔨	0	0	4	0	1	0	2	4	11
England (Pimblett)	4	1	0	1	0	2	0	0	8

=== Draw 15 ===
Thursday, November 9, 18:30

Sheet A	1	2	3	4	5	6	7	8	Final
England (Pimblett)	0	2	0	0	0	0	X	X	2
Poland (Daszkowski) 🔨	2	0	1	2	3	1	X	X	9

Sheet B	1	2	3	4	5	6	7	8	Final
Slovakia (Zaťko) 🔨	1	1	2	3	0	0	3	X	10
Spain (Rodríguez)	0	0	0	0	2	1	0	X	3

Sheet C	Final
Japan (Wachi)	L
Italy (Marchese) 🔨	W

Sheet D	1	2	3	4	5	6	7	8	Final
Denmark (Ørbæk)	0	0	1	0	0	2	2	X	5
Switzerland (Kneubühl) 🔨	1	3	0	3	1	0	0	X	8

== Playoffs ==
Semifinals
1	Estonia	9
4	Poland	2
2	Italy	2
3	Slovakia	7

Gold medal game
1	Estonia	4
3	Slovakia	8
Bronze medal game
2	Italy	9
4	Poland	7

=== Semifinals ===
Friday, November 10, 9:30

Sheet A	1	2	3	4	5	6	7	8	Final
Estonia (Koitmäe) 🔨	0	1	4	1	3	0	X	X	9
Poland (Daszkowski)	1	0	0	0	0	1	X	X	2

Sheet D	1	2	3	4	5	6	7	8	Final
Italy (Marchese) 🔨	1	0	0	1	0	0	0	X	2
Slovakia (Zaťko)	0	2	2	0	1	1	1	X	7

=== Bronze medal game ===
Friday, November 10, 16:00

Sheet C	1	2	3	4	5	6	7	8	Final
Italy (Marchese) 🔨	2	2	0	3	1	0	0	1	9
Poland (Daszkowski)	0	0	3	0	0	1	3	0	7

=== Gold medal game ===
Friday, November 10, 16:00

Sheet B	1	2	3	4	5	6	7	8	Final
Estonia (Koitmäe) 🔨	0	0	0	3	0	1	0	X	4
Slovakia (Zaťko)	0	1	1	0	2	0	4	X	8

== Final standings ==
Key
Teams Advance to the 2024 World Wheelchair Curling Championship

Place	Team
1st place, gold medalist(s)	Slovakia
2nd place, silver medalist(s)	Estonia
3rd place, bronze medalist(s)	Italy
4	Poland
5	Finland
6	Switzerland

Place	Team
7	England
8	Denmark
9	Brazil
10	Spain
11	Japan
