= Peter Zaťko (wheelchair curler) =

Slovak wheelchair curler

- Curler
- Born: 10 August 1983 (age 43); Topoľčany, Czechoslovakia

Team
- Curling club: Wheelchair Curling Club, Dubnica nad Váhom
- Skip: Radoslav Ďuriš
- Third: Peter Zaťko
- Second: Dušan Pitoňák
- Lead: Monika Kunkelová
- Alternate: Imrich Lyócsa

Curling career
- Member Association: Slovakia
- World Wheelchair Championship: 5 (2016, 2019, 2020, 2024, 2025)
- Paralympic: 3 (2018, 2022, 2026)

Peter Zaťko (born 10 August 1983 in Topoľčany) is a Slovak wheelchair curler.

He participated at the 2018 Winter Paralympics, where Slovak team finished in ninth place, and at the 2022 Winter Paralympics, where Slovak team finished fourth.

== Wheelchair curling teams and events ==
Season	Skip	Third	Second	Lead	Alternate	Coach	Events
2015–16	Radoslav Ďuriš	Dušan Pitoňák	Peter Zaťko	Monika Kunkelová	Imrich Lyócsa	František Pitoňák	WWhCC 2016 (9th)
2016–17	Radoslav Ďuriš	Dušan Pitoňák	Peter Zaťko	Monika Kunkelová	Imrich Lyócsa	František Pitoňák	WWhBCC 2016 (bronze)
2017–18	Dušan Pitoňák (fourth)	Radoslav Ďuriš (skip)	Peter Zaťko	Monika Kunkelová	Imrich Lyócsa	František Pitoňák, Pavol Pitoňák	WPG 2018 (9th)
2018–19	Radoslav Ďuriš	Dušan Pitoňák	Imrich Lyócsa	Monika Kunkelová	Peter Zaťko	František Pitoňák (WWhCC), Milan Bubenik	WWhBCC 2018 (silver); WWhCC 2019 (6th)
2019–20	Radoslav Ďuriš	Peter Zaťko	Dušan Pitoňák	Monika Kunkelová	Imrich Lyócsa	František Pitoňák	WWhCC 2020 (8th)
2020–21	Radoslav Ďuriš	Dušan Pitoňák	Peter Zaťko	Monika Kunkelová	Imrich Lyócsa	František Pitoňák	WWhCC 2021 (10th)
2021–22	Peter Zaťko (fourth)	Radoslav Ďuriš (skip)	Dušan Pitoňák	Monika Kunkelová	Alena Kánová	František Pitoňák	WPG 2022 (4th)
2023–24	Peter Zaťko	Radoslav Ďuriš	Dušan Pitoňák	Monika Kunkelová	Adrian Durcek	Daniela Matulová	WWhBCC 2023 (gold)
2023–24	Peter Zaťko (fourth)	Radoslav Ďuriš (skip)	Dušan Pitoňák	Monika Kunkelová	Adrian Durcek	Daniela Matulová, Milan Bubenik	WWhCC 2024 (7th)
2024–25	Radoslav Ďuriš	Peter Zaťko	Adrian Durček	Monika Kunkelová	Betty Vorosova	Daniela Matulová	WWhCC 2025 (4th)
