= Apinis =

Family name

Origin
- Origin: Latvian
- Meaning: "hop"

Apinis (feminine: Apine) is a Latvian masculine surname, derived from the Latvian word for "hop". Individuals with the surname include:

- Aigars Apinis (born 1973), paralympic athlete;
