= Uwe Mehlmann =

German Paralympic athlete

Medal record

Track and field (athletics)

Paralympic Games

Representing West Germany
Silver medal – second place	1988 Seoul	100 metres - B3

Representing Germany
Gold medal – first place	1992 Barcelona	200 metres - B3
Silver medal – second place	1992 Barcelona	100 metres - B3
Bronze medal – third place	1992 Barcelona	Long Jump - B3

Uwe Mehlmann is a paralympic athlete from Germany competing mainly in category B3 sprint events.

Uwe competed in both the 1988 Summer Paralympics for West Germany and the 1992 Summer Paralympics for Germany. In 1988 he won a silver medal in the 100m behind Australia's David Goodman he also competed in the long jump finishing fourth and the 400m finishing fourth again. At the 1992 games he won gold ahead of Italian Aldo Manganaro in the 200m having broken the games record in the heats and the final, he then swapped places with the Italian to win silver in the 100m and also won bronze in the long jump.
