= Latvia at the 2000 Summer Paralympics =

- IPC code: LAT
- NPC: Latvian Paralympic Committee
- Website: www.lpkomiteja.lv (in Latvian)

in Sydney
- Competitors: 5
- Medals Ranked 63rd: Gold 0 Silver 0 Bronze 3 Total 3

Summer Paralympics appearances (overview)
- 1992; 1996; 2000; 2004; 2008; 2012; 2016; 2020; 2024

Other related appearances
- Soviet Union (1988)

Latvia participated in the XI Summer Paralympic Games in Sydney, Australia.

== Medalists ==
Medal	Name	Sport	Event
Bronze	Aigars Apinis	Athletics	Men's Discus throw F52
Bronze	Armands Lizbovskis	Athletics	Men's Long jump F13
Bronze	Aigars Apinis	Athletics	Men's Shot put F52

== See also ==
- Latvia at the Paralympics
- Latvia at the 2000 Summer Olympics
