= Equestrian at the 2016 Summer Paralympics – Individual freestyle test grade Ia =

Equestrian – Individual freestyle test, grade Ia at the XV Paralympic Games
- Venue: Olympic Equestrian Centre
- Date: 16 September 2016
- Competitors: 8 from 7 nations
- Winning score: 79.700

Medalists
1st place, gold medalist(s)		Sophie Christiansen	Great Britain
2nd place, silver medalist(s)		Anne Dunham	Great Britain
3rd place, bronze medalist(s)		Sérgio Fróes Oliva	Brazil

The individual freestyle test, grade Ia, para-equestrian dressage event at the 2016 Summer Paralympics was contested on the afternoon of 15 September 2016 at the Olympic Equestrian Centre in Rio de Janeiro.

The competition was assessed by a ground jury composed of five judges placed at locations designated E, H, C, M, and B. Each judge rated the competitors' performances with a percentage score. The five scores from the jury were then averaged to determine a rider's total percentage score.

== Ground jury ==
Judge at E	Hanneke Gerritsen ( Netherlands)
Judge at H	Anne Prain ( France)
Judge at C	Sarah Leitch ( Great Britain), jury president
Judge at M	Marc Urban ( Belgium)
Judge at B	Alison King ( Hong Kong)

== Results ==
Rank	Start Order	Rider	Horse		Technical/Artistic & (Rank)					Tech/Art % (Rk)	Total % score
Rank	Start Order	Rider	Horse		E	H	C	M	B	Tech/Art % (Rk)	Total % score
Gold medal	8	Sophie Christiansen (GBR)	Athene Lindebjerg		77.000 (1)	78.250 (1)	80.250 (1)	78.750 (1)	84.250 (1)		79.700
Gold medal	8	Sophie Christiansen (GBR)	Athene Lindebjerg	Tech:	75.000 (2)	76.500 (1)	79.500 (1)	76.500 (1)	81.500 (1)	77.800 (1)	
Gold medal	8	Sophie Christiansen (GBR)	Athene Lindebjerg	Art:	79.000 (1)	80.000 (1)	81.000 (1)	81.000 (1)	87.000 (1)	81.600 (1)	
Silver medal	5	Anne Dunham (GBR)	LJT Lucas Normark		76.500 (2)	74.500 (3)	77.750 (2)	75.000 (2)	76.500 (2)		76.050
Silver medal	5	Anne Dunham (GBR)	LJT Lucas Normark	Tech:	75.500 (1)	72.500 (5)	78.000 (2)	74.000 (2)	74.500 (2)	74.900 (2)	
Silver medal	5	Anne Dunham (GBR)	LJT Lucas Normark	Art:	77.500 (2)	76.500 (3)	77.500 (2)	76.000 (2)	78.500 (3)	77.200 (2)	
Bronze medal	6	Sérgio Fróes Oliva (BRA)	Coco Chanel		73.750 (3)	76.000 (2)	75.750 (4)	73.750 (4)	76.500 (2)		75.150
Bronze medal	6	Sérgio Fróes Oliva (BRA)	Coco Chanel	Tech:	72.500 (4)	75.000 (2)	74.500 (4)	73.000 (3)	73.000 (5)	73.600 (3)	
Bronze medal	6	Sérgio Fróes Oliva (BRA)	Coco Chanel	Art:	75.000 (3)	77.000 (2)	77.000 (3)	74.500 (4)	80.000 (2)	76.700 (3)	
4	4	Elke Philipp (GER)	Regaliz		73.500 (4)	74.250 (4)	74.250 (5)	71.750 (7)	74.750 (5)		73.700
4	4	Elke Philipp (GER)	Regaliz	Tech:	73.500 (3)	73.500 (3)	73.500 (5)	70.500 (7)	73.500 (3)	72.900 (4)	
4	4	Elke Philipp (GER)	Regaliz	Art:	73.500 (4)	75.000 (4)	75.000 (5)	73.000 (7)	76.000 (6)	74.500 (4)	
5	2	Rihards Snikus (LAT)	King of the Dance		72.000 (5)	72.000 (5)	71.000 (7)	74.250 (3)	75.250 (4)		72.900
5	2	Rihards Snikus (LAT)	King of the Dance	Tech:	72.000 (5)	73.000 (4)	71.000 (6)	73.000 (3)	73.500 (3)	72.500 (5)	
5	2	Rihards Snikus (LAT)	King of the Dance	Art:	72.000 (6)	71.000 (6)	71.000 (7)	75.500 (3)	77.000 (4)	73.300 (6)	
6	7	Laurentia Tan (SIN)	Fuerst Sherlock		70.250 (7)	68.250 (7)	76.000 (3)	72.750 (5)	74.250 (6)		72.300
6	7	Laurentia Tan (SIN)	Fuerst Sherlock	Tech:	69.500 (7)	70.000 (6)	75.000 (3)	72.000 (5)	72.000 (6)	70.900 (6)	
6	7	Laurentia Tan (SIN)	Fuerst Sherlock	Art:	71.000 (7)	70.500 (7)	77.000 (3)	73.500 (5)	76.500 (5)	73.700 (5)	
7	3	Katja Karjalainen (FIN)	High Flow		72.000 (5)	71.250 (6)	71.500 (6)	72.750 (5)	71.750 (7)		71.850
7	3	Katja Karjalainen (FIN)	High Flow	Tech:	70.500 (6)	70.000 (6)	70.500 (7)	72.000 (5)	70.000 (7)	70.600 (7)	
7	3	Katja Karjalainen (FIN)	High Flow	Art:	73.500 (4)	72.500 (5)	72.500 (6)	73.500 (5)	73.500 (7)	73.100 (7)	
8	1	Anita Johnsson (SWE)	Dear Friend		63.000 (8)	62.500 (8)	59.000 (8)	62.000 (8)	63.750 (8)		62.050
8	1	Anita Johnsson (SWE)	Dear Friend	Tech:	64.000 (8)	61.000 (8)	62.500 (8)	61.500 (8)	65.500 (8)	62.900 (8)	
8	1	Anita Johnsson (SWE)	Dear Friend	Art:	62.000 (8)	64.000 (8)	55.500 (8)	62.500 (8)	62.000 (8)	61.200 (8)	
