= Dušan Pitoňák =

Slovak wheelchair curler

- Curler
- Born: 7 August 1965 (age 61); Poprad, Czechoslovak Socialist Republic

Team
- Curling club: Wheelchair Curling Club, Dubnica nad Váhom
- Skip: Radoslav Ďuriš
- Third: Peter Zaťko
- Second: Dušan Pitoňák
- Lead: Monika Kunkelová
- Alternate: Imrich Lyócsa

Curling career
- Member Association: Slovakia
- World Wheelchair Championship: 7 (2012, 2013, 2015, 2016, 2019, 2020, 2024)
- Paralympic: 3 (2014, 2018, 2022)

Dušan Pitoňák (born 7 August 1965 in Poprad) is a Slovak wheelchair curler.

He participated at the 2014 and 2018 Winter Paralympics where Slovak team finished on sixth and ninth places respectively.

== Wheelchair curling teams and events ==
Season	Skip	Third	Second	Lead	Alternate	Coach	Events
2008–09	Radoslav Ďuriš	Dušan Pitoňák	Branislav Jakubec	Alena Kánová	Imrich Lyócsa	Pavol Pitoňák	WWhCQ 2008 (10th)
2010–11	Radoslav Ďuriš	Dušan Pitoňák	Branislav Jakubec	Alena Kánová	Monika Kunkelová	František Pitoňák	WWhCQ 2010 (6th)
2011–12	Radoslav Ďuriš	Branislav Jakubec	Dušan Pitoňák	Monika Kunkelová	Alena Kánová (WWhCC)	František Pitoňák	WWhCQ 2011 (gold); WWhCC 2012 (4th)
2012–13	Radoslav Ďuriš	Branislav Jakubec	Dušan Pitoňák	Monika Kunkelová	Alena Kánová	František Pitoňák	WWhCC 2013 (7th)
2013–14	Radoslav Ďuriš	Branislav Jakubec	Dušan Pitoňák	Monika Kunkelová	Alena Kánová	František Pitoňák	WPG 2014 (6th)
2014–15	Radoslav Ďuriš	Branislav Jakubec	Dušan Pitoňák	Monika Kunkelová	Imrich Lyócsa	František Pitoňák	WWhCC 2015 (4th)
2015–16	Radoslav Ďuriš	Dušan Pitoňák	Peter Zaťko	Monika Kunkelová	Imrich Lyócsa	František Pitoňák	WWhCC 2016 (9th)
2016–17	Radoslav Ďuriš	Dušan Pitoňák	Peter Zaťko	Monika Kunkelová	Imrich Lyócsa	František Pitoňák	WWhBCC 2016 (bronze)
2017–18	Dušan Pitoňák (fourth)	Radoslav Ďuriš (skip)	Peter Zaťko	Monika Kunkelová	Imrich Lyócsa	František Pitoňák, Pavol Pitoňák	WPG 2018 (9th)
2018–19	Radoslav Ďuriš	Dušan Pitoňák	Imrich Lyócsa	Monika Kunkelová	Peter Zaťko	František Pitoňák (WWhCC), Milan Bubenik	WWhBCC 2018 (silver); WWhCC 2019 (6th)
2019–20	Radoslav Ďuriš	Peter Zaťko	Dušan Pitoňák	Monika Kunkelová	Imrich Lyócsa	František Pitoňák	WWhCC 2020 (8th)
