= André Andrade (athlete) =

Brazilian Paralympic athlete

Personal information
- Born: 1980 or 1981 (age 45–46) Porto Alegre, Brazil
- Height: 1.69 m (5 ft 7 in)

Sport
- Disability class: T13
Medal record
Track and field (athletics)
Representing Brazil
Paralympic Games
Gold medal – first place	2004 Athens	200 m - T13
Silver medal – second place	2000 Sydney	100 m - T13
Silver medal – second place	2000 Sydney	200 m - T13
Silver medal – second place	2004 Athens	100 m - T13
Parapan American Games
Gold medal – first place	2007 Rio de Janeiro	100m - T13
Silver medal – second place	2007 Rio de Janeiro	200m - T13
Silver medal – second place	2011 Guadalajara	100m - T13
Silver medal – second place	2011 Guadalajara	200m - T13
Silver medal – second place	2011 Guadalajara	400m - T13

André Andrade is a Paralympic athlete from Brazil competing mainly in category T13 sprints events.

André has competed in the sprint events at three consecutive Paralympics in 2000 he competed in the 400m and won silvers in both the 100m and 200m. In the 2004 Summer Paralympics he was part of the unsuccessful Brazilian T11-13 4 × 100 m relay team but did improve to gold in the T13 100m and silver in the 200m. He again competed in the 100m, 200m and 4 × 100 m in 2008 but this time failed to win any medals.
