= 2023 World Wheelchair Mixed Doubles Curling Championship =

- Host city: Richmond, British Columbia, Canada
- Arena: Richmond Curling Centre
- Dates: March 4–12
- Winner: Latvia
- Female: Poļina Rožkova
- Male: Agris Lasmans
- Finalist: United States (Wilson / Samsa)

The 2023 World Wheelchair Mixed Doubles Curling Championship was held from March 4 to 12 at the Richmond Curling Centre in Richmond, British Columbia, Canada. The event was held in conjunction with the 2023 World Wheelchair Curling Championship.

== Teams ==
The teams are listed as follows:

Canada	China	Denmark	England
Female: Collinda Joseph; Male: Dennis Thiessen	Female: Wang Meng; Male: Chen Jianxin	Female: Helle Christiansen; Male: Jack Brendle	Female: Rosemary Lenton; Male: Stewart Pimblett
Estonia	Finland	Germany	Hungary
Female: Katlin Riidebach; Male: Mait Mätas	Female: Sari Karjalainen; Male: Markku Karjalainen	Female: Christiane Putzich; Male: Burkhard Möller	Female: Anikó Sasadi; Male: Péter Barkóczi
Italy	Japan	Latvia	Norway
Female: Giuliana Turra; Male: Emanuele Spelorzi	Female: Miki Ono; Male: Shuichi Iljima	Female: Poļina Rožkova; Male: Agris Lasmans	Female: Rikke Iversen; Male: Rune Lorentsen
Poland	Scotland	Slovakia	South Korea
Female: Joanna Kozakiewicz; Male: Michał Gasik-Daszkowski	Female: Charlotte McKenna; Male: David Melrose	Female: Monika Kunkelová; Male: Radoslav Ďuriš	Female: Cho Min-kyong; Male: Jeong Tae-yeong
Sweden	Switzerland	United States	
Female: Rebecka Carlsson; Male: Tommy Andersson	Female: Beatrix Blauel; Male: Marcel Bodenmann	Female: Pam Wilson; Male: David Samsa	

== Round robin standings ==
Final Round Robin Standings

Key
Teams to Playoffs

Group A	Athletes	W	L	W–L	PF	PA	EW	EL	BE	SE	DSC
China	Wang Meng / Chen Jianxin	9	0	–	89	40	36	30	0	10	89.09
United States	Pam Wilson / David Samsa	5	4	1–0	59	61	34	36	0	10	131.39
Slovakia	Monika Kunkelová / Radoslav Ďuriš	5	4	0–1	55	56	41	29	0	22	136.39
Scotland	Charlotte McKenna / David Melrose	4	5	2–2	54	66	30	36	0	12	110.79
Estonia	Katlin Riidebach / Mait Mätas	4	5	2–2	65	64	32	36	0	11	127.02
Hungary	Anikó Sasadi / Péter Barkóczi	4	5	2–2	61	58	35	36	0	15	135.56
Norway	Rikke Iversen / Rune Lorentsen	4	5	2–2	56	60	34	33	0	14	143.89
Switzerland	Beatrix Blauel / Marcel Bodenmann	4	5	2–2	55	74	31	38	0	13	149.19
Poland	Joanna Kozakiewicz / Michał Gasik-Daszkowski	3	6	1–0	53	73	33	39	0	7	114.66
Finland	Sari Karjalainen / Markku Karjalainen	3	6	0–1	56	51	37	30	0	18	108.24

Group B	Athletes	W	L	W–L	PF	PA	EW	EL	BE	SE	DSC
Canada	Collinda Joseph / Dennis Thiessen	8	0	–	76	36	40	19	0	19	77.73
Latvia	Poļina Rožkova / Agris Lasmans	6	2	1–0	66	46	39	23	0	16	122.94
England	Rosemary Lenton / Stewart Pimblett	6	2	0–1	49	48	28	35	0	4	129.85
South Korea	Cho Min-kyong / Jeong Tae-yeong	5	3	1–0	62	46	32	29	0	10	89.52
Germany	Christiane Putzich / Burkhard Möller	5	3	0–1	61	58	33	31	0	10	148.99
Italy	Giuliana Turra / Emanuele Spelorzi	3	5	–	49	49	31	30	0	11	139.06
Japan	Miki Ono / Shuichi Iljima	1	7	1–1	43	68	24	34	0	7	81.85
Sweden	Rebecka Carlsson / Tommy Andersson	1	7	1–1	42	70	25	39	1	6	109.80
Denmark	Helle Christiansen / Jack Brendle	1	7	1–1	38	65	24	36	0	6	159.76

Group A Round Robin Summary Table
Pos.	Country	China	Estonia	Finland	Hungary	Norway	Poland	Scotland	Slovakia	Switzerland	United States	Record
1	China	—	10–6	8–7	9–5	9–1	15–3	10–3	11–5	8–7	9–3	9–0
5	Estonia	6–10	—	0–9	8–5	11–2	10–5	9–10	5–6	7–9	9–8	4–5
10	Finland	7–8	9–0	—	4–8	5–8	5–6	7–6	6–7	8–2	5–6	3–6
6	Hungary	5–9	5–8	8–4	—	6–5	6–9	9–3	9–3	8–9	5–8	4–5
7	Norway	1–9	2–11	8–5	5–6	—	8–9	11–6	4–6	10–2	7–6	4–5
9	Poland	3–15	5–10	6–5	9–6	9–8	—	8–9	4–5	4–8	5–7	3–6
4	Scotland	3–10	10–9	6–7	3–9	6–11	9–8	—	0–8	11–3	6–1	4–5
3	Slovakia	5–11	6–5	7–6	3–9	6–4	5–4	8–0	—	7–8	8–9	5–4
8	Switzerland	7–8	9–7	2–8	9–8	2–10	8–4	3–11	8–7	—	7–11	4–5
2	United States	3–9	8–9	6–5	8–5	6–7	7–5	1–6	9–8	11–7	—	5–4

Group B Round Robin Summary Table
Pos.	Country	Canada	Denmark	England	Germany	Italy	Japan	Latvia	South Korea	Sweden	Record
1	Canada	—	8–1	9–1	10–4	8–4	13–7	10–5	9–6	9–8	8–0
9	Denmark	1–8	—	6–8	7–9	3–10	9–7	2–8	3–7	7–8	1–7
3	England	1–9	8–6	—	8–6	7–6	6–4	4–8	6–5	9–4	6–2
5	Germany	4–10	9–7	6–8	—	8–5	10–4	10–9	6–9	8–6	5–3
6	Italy	4–8	10–3	6–7	5–8	—	9–3	5–8	4–8	6–4	3–5
7	Japan	7–13	7–9	4–6	4–10	3–9	—	4–9	2–10	12–2	1–7
2	Latvia	5–10	8–2	8–4	9–10	8–5	9–4	—	10–7	9–4	6–2
4	South Korea	6–9	7–3	5–6	9–6	8–4	10–2	7–10	—	10–6	5–3
8	Sweden	8–9	8–7	4–9	6–8	4–6	2–12	4–9	6–10	—	1–7

== Round robin results ==
All draws times are listed in Pacific Time (UTC−08:00).

=== Draw 1 ===
Saturday, March 4, 9:00 am

Sheet A	1	2	3	4	5	6	7	8	Final
Denmark (Christiansen / Brendle)	0	0	0	0	0	1	0	X	1
Canada (Joseph / Thiessen) 🔨	2	1	1	1	1	0	2	X	8

Sheet C	1	2	3	4	5	6	7	8	Final
Japan (Ono / Iljima) 🔨	4	1	1	0	1	2	3	X	12
Sweden (Carlsson / Andersson)	0	0	0	2	0	0	0	X	2

Sheet E	1	2	3	4	5	6	7	8	EE	Final
Slovakia (Kunkelová / Ďuriš) 🔨	2	0	1	1	0	2	1	0	0	7
Switzerland (Blauel / Bodenmann)	0	3	0	0	2	0	0	2	1	8

Sheet B	1	2	3	4	5	6	7	8	Final
Latvia (Rožkova / Lasmans) 🔨	0	1	0	3	0	1	0	3	8
Italy (Turra / Spelorzi)	1	0	2	0	1	0	1	0	5

Sheet D	1	2	3	4	5	6	7	8	Final
South Korea (Cho / Jeong) 🔨	2	0	3	0	0	2	2	0	9
Germany (Putzich / Möller)	0	1	0	2	1	0	0	2	6

=== Draw 2 ===
Saturday, March 4, 4:00 pm

Sheet A	1	2	3	4	5	6	7	8	EE	Final
Norway (Iversen / Lorentsen) 🔨	1	0	1	0	2	1	0	3	0	8
Poland (Kozakiewicz / Gasik-Daszkowski)	0	4	0	3	0	0	1	0	1	9

Sheet C	1	2	3	4	5	6	7	8	Final
Canada (Joseph / Thiessen)	1	0	0	2	1	0	3	2	9
South Korea (Cho / Jeong) 🔨	0	1	1	0	0	4	0	0	6

Sheet E	1	2	3	4	5	6	7	8	Final
Hungary (Sasadi / Barkóczi)	1	2	0	3	0	2	1	X	9
Scotland (McKenna / Melrose) 🔨	0	0	2	0	1	0	0	X	3

Sheet B	1	2	3	4	5	6	7	8	Final
United States (Wilson / Samsa)	0	0	1	2	0	2	1	0	6
Finland (Karjalainen / Karjalainen) 🔨	1	1	0	0	1	0	0	2	5

Sheet D	1	2	3	4	5	6	7	8	Final
China (Wang / Chen) 🔨	5	0	2	0	3	0	0	X	10
Estonia (Riidebach / Mätas)	0	1	0	3	0	1	1	X	6

Sheet F	1	2	3	4	5	6	7	8	EE	Final
Italy (Turra / Spelorzi)	0	1	0	1	1	2	0	1	0	6
England (Lenton / Pimblett) 🔨	3	0	1	0	0	0	2	0	1	7

=== Draw 3 ===
Sunday, March 5, 9:00 am

Sheet A	1	2	3	4	5	6	7	8	EE	Final
Estonia (Riidebach / Mätas)	0	1	1	0	1	0	0	2	0	5
Slovakia (Kunkelová / Ďuriš) 🔨	1	0	0	1	0	1	2	0	1	6

Sheet C	1	2	3	4	5	6	7	8	Final
Sweden (Carlsson / Andersson)	1	0	1	0	2	0	0	X	4
England (Lenton / Pimblett) 🔨	0	3	0	2	0	3	1	X	9

Sheet E	1	2	3	4	5	6	7	8	Final
United States (Wilson / Samsa) 🔨	0	1	0	2	0	3	1	0	7
Poland (Kozakiewicz / Gasik-Daszkowski)	1	0	2	0	1	0	0	1	5

Sheet B	1	2	3	4	5	6	7	8	Final
Denmark (Christiansen / Brendle)	0	3	1	0	0	3	0	0	7
Germany (Putzich / Möller) 🔨	1	0	0	4	1	0	2	1	9

Sheet D	1	2	3	4	5	6	7	8	Final
Latvia (Rožkova / Lasmans) 🔨	3	0	1	1	1	0	3	X	9
Japan (Ono / Iljima)	0	1	0	0	0	3	0	X	4

Sheet F	1	2	3	4	5	6	7	8	Final
China (Wang / Chen) 🔨	0	3	0	2	1	0	2	0	8
Switzerland (Blauel / Bodenmann)	1	0	1	0	0	2	0	3	7

=== Draw 4 ===
Sunday, March 5, 4:00 pm

Sheet A	1	2	3	4	5	6	7	8	Final
Sweden (Carlsson / Andersson) 🔨	3	0	0	0	1	2	2	0	8
Denmark (Christiansen / Brendle)	0	3	2	1	0	0	0	1	7

Sheet C	1	2	3	4	5	6	7	8	Final
Germany (Putzich / Möller)	2	1	0	4	0	1	2	X	10
Japan (Ono / Iljima) 🔨	0	0	2	0	2	0	0	X	4

Sheet E	1	2	3	4	5	6	7	8	Final
Switzerland (Blauel / Bodenmann) 🔨	1	0	3	1	0	0	3	1	9
Hungary (Sasadi / Barkóczi)	0	1	0	0	5	2	0	0	8

Sheet B	1	2	3	4	5	6	7	8	Final
Norway (Iversen / Lorentsen)	0	0	0	1	0	1	X	X	2
Estonia (Riidebach / Mätas) 🔨	3	3	2	0	3	0	X	X	11

Sheet D	1	2	3	4	5	6	7	8	Final
Scotland (McKenna / Melrose)	0	1	0	1	0	1	0	X	3
China (Wang / Chen) 🔨	1	0	2	0	2	0	5	X	10

Sheet F	1	2	3	4	5	6	7	8	Final
England (Lenton / Pimblett)	0	0	3	0	0	1	0	0	4
Latvia (Rožkova / Lasmans) 🔨	1	1	0	1	2	0	2	1	8

=== Draw 5 ===
Monday, March 6, 9:00 am

Sheet A	1	2	3	4	5	6	7	8	Final
Poland (Kozakiewicz / Gasik-Daszkowski) 🔨	2	1	0	0	1	1	0	0	5
Estonia (Riidebach / Mätas)	0	0	4	2	0	0	2	2	10

Sheet C	1	2	3	4	5	6	7	8	EE	Final
Norway (Iversen / Lorentsen)	0	1	0	1	0	1	1	1	0	5
Hungary (Sasadi / Barkóczi) 🔨	1	0	2	0	2	0	0	0	1	6

Sheet E	1	2	3	4	5	6	7	8	Final
China (Wang / Chen)	2	0	0	2	0	0	4	0	8
Finland (Karjalainen / Karjalainen) 🔨	0	2	1	0	1	1	0	2	7

Sheet B	1	2	3	4	5	6	7	8	Final
Scotland (McKenna / Melrose) 🔨	0	0	0	0	0	0	0	X	0
Slovakia (Kunkelová / Ďuriš)	1	1	2	1	1	1	1	X	8

Sheet D	1	2	3	4	5	6	7	8	Final
Switzerland (Blauel / Bodenmann)	0	1	1	0	3	0	2	0	7
United States (Wilson / Samsa) 🔨	2	0	0	5	0	1	0	3	11

Sheet F	1	2	3	4	5	6	7	8	Final
Canada (Joseph / Thiessen) 🔨	1	2	0	1	3	1	0	X	8
Italy (Turra / Spelorzi)	0	0	1	0	0	0	3	X	4

=== Draw 6 ===
Monday, March 6, 4:30 pm

Sheet A	1	2	3	4	5	6	7	8	Final
Slovakia (Kunkelová / Ďuriš)	1	1	2	1	0	1	1	0	7
Finland (Karjalainen / Karjalainen) 🔨	0	0	0	0	3	0	0	3	6

Sheet C	1	2	3	4	5	6	7	8	Final
China (Wang / Chen) 🔨	3	0	3	0	2	0	1	X	9
United States (Wilson / Samsa)	0	1	0	1	0	1	0	X	3

Sheet E	1	2	3	4	5	6	7	8	Final
Italy (Turra / Spelorzi)	1	0	2	0	1	0	1	0	5
Germany (Putzich / Möller) 🔨	0	1	0	3	0	2	0	2	8

Sheet B	1	2	3	4	5	6	7	8	Final
Canada (Joseph / Thiessen) 🔨	0	2	0	0	3	0	5	X	10
Latvia (Rožkova / Lasmans)	1	0	1	2	0	1	0	X	5

Sheet D	1	2	3	4	5	6	7	8	Final
England (Lenton / Pimblett) 🔨	2	1	0	0	0	1	0	2	6
South Korea (Cho / Jeong)	0	0	1	2	1	0	1	0	5

Sheet F	1	2	3	4	5	6	7	8	Final
Scotland (McKenna / Melrose) 🔨	3	0	0	0	3	0	0	X	6
Norway (Iversen / Lorentsen)	0	1	2	1	0	4	3	X	11

=== Draw 7 ===
Tuesday, March 7, 9:00 am

Sheet A	1	2	3	4	5	6	7	8	Final
Japan (Ono / Iljima) 🔨	1	0	1	0	0	1	1	0	4
England (Lenton / Pimblett)	0	2	0	1	2	0	0	1	6

Sheet C	1	2	3	4	5	6	7	8	Final
Denmark (Christiansen / Brendle)	0	0	0	2	0	0	0	X	2
Latvia (Rožkova / Lasmans) 🔨	2	2	1	0	1	1	1	X	8

Sheet F	1	2	3	4	5	6	7	8	Final
Hungary (Sasadi / Barkóczi)	2	0	0	3	0	0	0	0	5
United States (Wilson / Samsa) 🔨	0	2	1	0	2	1	1	1	8

Sheet B	1	2	3	4	5	6	7	8	Final
Italy (Turra / Spelorzi)	2	0	0	0	1	1	1	1	6
Sweden (Carlsson / Andersson) 🔨	0	1	1	2	0	0	0	0	4

Sheet D	1	2	3	4	5	6	7	8	Final
Germany (Putzich / Möller)	0	1	0	0	3	0	0	X	4
Canada (Joseph / Thiessen) 🔨	1	0	4	1	0	3	1	X	10

=== Draw 8 ===
Tuesday, March 7, 4:30 pm

Sheet A	1	2	3	4	5	6	7	8	Final
United States (Wilson / Samsa) 🔨	2	0	1	2	0	0	1	0	6
Norway (Iversen / Lorentsen)	0	1	0	0	4	1	0	1	7

Sheet C	1	2	3	4	5	6	7	8	Final
Poland (Kozakiewicz / Gasik-Daszkowski)	0	0	1	0	2	0	0	X	3
China (Wang / Chen) 🔨	5	2	0	4	0	2	2	X	15

Sheet E	1	2	3	4	5	6	7	8	Final
Scotland (McKenna / Melrose)	1	1	0	0	5	0	0	3	10
Estonia (Riidebach / Mätas) 🔨	0	0	2	3	0	2	2	0	9

Sheet B	1	2	3	4	5	6	7	8	Final
Finland (Karjalainen / Karjalainen) 🔨	0	1	1	2	0	1	3	X	8
Switzerland (Blauel / Bodenmann)	1	0	0	0	1	0	0	X	2

Sheet D	1	2	3	4	5	6	7	8	Final
Hungary (Sasadi / Barkóczi) 🔨	1	1	0	1	3	0	3	X	9
Slovakia (Kunkelová / Ďuriš)	0	0	1	0	0	2	0	X	3

Sheet F	1	2	3	4	5	6	7	8	9	10	Final
Sweden (Carlsson / Andersson) 🔨	2	0	1	0	1	0	2	0	0	0	6
South Korea (Cho / Jeong)	0	1	0	2	0	1	0	2	0	4	10

=== Draw 9 ===
Wednesday, March 8, 9:00 am

Sheet A	1	2	3	4	5	6	7	8	EE	Final
Latvia (Rožkova / Lasmans) 🔨	3	0	1	1	0	0	4	0	0	9
Germany (Putzich / Möller)	0	3	0	0	2	1	0	3	1	10

Sheet C	1	2	3	4	5	6	7	8	Final
England (Lenton / Pimblett)	0	1	0	0	0	0	0	X	1
Canada (Joseph / Thiessen) 🔨	1	0	2	1	2	1	2	X	9

Sheet E	1	2	3	4	5	6	7	8	Final
South Korea (Cho / Jeong)	1	0	0	3	2	4	X	X	10
Japan (Ono / Iljima) 🔨	0	1	1	0	0	0	X	X	2

Sheet B	1	2	3	4	5	6	7	8	Final
China (Wang / Chen) 🔨	2	0	2	1	2	1	1	X	9
Norway (Iversen / Lorentsen)	0	1	0	0	0	0	0	X	1

Sheet D	1	2	3	4	5	6	7	8	Final
Denmark (Christiansen / Brendle)	0	1	0	1	0	1	0	X	3
Italy (Turra / Spelorzi) 🔨	4	0	2	0	3	0	1	X	10

Sheet F	1	2	3	4	5	6	7	8	Final
Estonia (Riidebach / Mätas) 🔨	0	0	0	0	0	0	X	X	0
Finland (Karjalainen / Karjalainen)	3	2	1	1	1	1	X	X	9

=== Draw 10 ===
Wednesday, March 8, 4:30 pm

Sheet A	1	2	3	4	5	6	7	8	Final
Switzerland (Blauel / Bodenmann)	0	0	0	0	0	3	0	X	3
Scotland (McKenna / Melrose) 🔨	3	2	2	1	2	0	1	X	11

Sheet C	1	2	3	4	5	6	7	8	Final
United States (Wilson / Samsa) 🔨	2	2	0	1	1	0	3	0	9
Slovakia (Kunkelová / Ďuriš)	0	0	2	0	0	5	0	1	8

Sheet E	1	2	3	4	5	6	7	8	Final
Sweden (Carlsson / Andersson) 🔨	1	0	0	2	0	1	0	0	4
Latvia (Rožkova / Lasmans)	0	3	2	0	1	0	2	1	9

Sheet B	1	2	3	4	5	6	7	8	EE	Final
Estonia (Riidebach / Mätas)	0	1	0	0	0	3	1	0	3	8
Hungary (Sasadi / Barkóczi) 🔨	1	0	1	1	1	0	0	1	0	5

Sheet D	1	2	3	4	5	6	7	8	Final
Finland (Karjalainen / Karjalainen)	0	2	0	1	1	0	0	1	5
Poland (Kozakiewicz / Gasik-Daszkowski) 🔨	1	0	3	0	0	1	1	0	6

Sheet F	1	2	3	4	5	6	7	8	Final
Japan (Ono / Iljima) 🔨	2	0	0	0	3	2	0	0	7
Denmark (Christiansen / Brendle)	0	3	1	2	0	0	2	1	9

=== Draw 11 ===
Thursday, March 9, 9:00 am

Sheet A	1	2	3	4	5	6	7	8	Final
Hungary (Sasadi / Barkóczi)	1	0	1	2	1	0	0	0	5
China (Wang / Chen) 🔨	0	3	0	0	0	3	1	2	9

Sheet C	1	2	3	4	5	6	7	8	Final
Finland (Karjalainen / Karjalainen)	1	2	0	0	2	0	1	1	7
Scotland (McKenna / Melrose) 🔨	0	0	2	3	0	1	0	0	6

Sheet E	1	2	3	4	5	6	7	8	Final
Estonia (Riidebach / Mätas) 🔨	3	0	2	0	2	0	1	1	9
United States (Wilson / Samsa)	0	1	0	4	0	3	0	0	8

Sheet B	1	2	3	4	5	6	7	8	Final
Switzerland (Blauel / Bodenmann)	0	1	1	2	1	0	0	3	8
Poland (Kozakiewicz / Gasik-Daszkowski) 🔨	1	0	0	0	0	2	1	0	4

Sheet D	1	2	3	4	5	6	7	8	Final
Slovakia (Kunkelová / Ďuriš)	0	1	1	0	1	3	0	X	6
Norway (Iversen / Lorentsen) 🔨	1	0	0	2	0	0	1	X	4

=== Draw 12 ===
Thursday, March 9, 6:00 pm

Sheet A	1	2	3	4	5	6	7	8	Final
Italy (Turra / Spelorzi)	1	0	3	1	1	0	3	X	9
Japan (Ono / Iljima) 🔨	0	2	0	0	0	1	0	X	3

Sheet C	1	2	3	4	5	6	7	8	Final
South Korea (Cho / Jeong) 🔨	3	0	2	0	1	0	1	X	7
Denmark (Christiansen / Brendle)	0	1	0	1	0	1	0	X	3

Sheet E	1	2	3	4	5	6	7	8	Final
Finland (Karjalainen / Karjalainen) 🔨	0	0	1	0	0	3	1	X	5
Norway (Iversen / Lorentsen)	1	2	0	4	1	0	0	X	8

Sheet B	1	2	3	4	5	6	7	8	Final
Germany (Putzich / Möller)	0	1	0	1	0	0	4	0	6
England (Lenton / Pimblett) 🔨	1	0	1	0	3	1	0	2	8

Sheet D	1	2	3	4	5	6	7	8	Final
Canada (Joseph / Thiessen) 🔨	3	0	2	1	0	1	0	2	9
Sweden (Carlsson / Andersson)	0	2	0	0	2	0	4	0	8

Sheet F	1	2	3	4	5	6	7	8	Final
Poland (Kozakiewicz / Gasik-Daszkowski) 🔨	0	2	0	0	0	1	0	1	4
Slovakia (Kunkelová / Ďuriš)	1	0	1	1	1	0	1	0	5

=== Draw 13 ===
Friday, March 10, 9:00 am

Sheet A	1	2	3	4	5	6	7	8	EE	Final
Germany (Putzich / Möller)	0	0	1	2	1	0	2	0	2	8
Sweden (Carlsson / Andersson) 🔨	2	1	0	0	0	2	0	1	0	6

Sheet C	1	2	3	4	5	6	7	8	Final
Switzerland (Blauel / Bodenmann) 🔨	2	1	0	0	3	3	0	X	9
Estonia (Riidebach / Mätas)	0	0	2	2	0	0	3	X	7

Sheet E	1	2	3	4	5	6	7	8	Final
Latvia (Rožkova / Lasmans)	0	2	0	2	1	3	0	2	10
South Korea (Cho / Jeong) 🔨	1	0	4	0	0	0	2	0	7

Sheet B	1	2	3	4	5	6	7	8	Final
Japan (Ono / Iljima) 🔨	2	0	2	0	0	0	3	0	7
Canada (Joseph / Thiessen)	0	5	0	2	2	1	0	3	13

Sheet D	1	2	3	4	5	6	7	8	Final
Poland (Kozakiewicz / Gasik-Daszkowski) 🔨	3	1	1	0	0	2	0	2	9
Hungary (Sasadi / Barkóczi)	0	0	0	2	1	0	3	0	6

Sheet F	1	2	3	4	5	6	7	8	Final
United States (Wilson / Samsa) 🔨	0	0	1	0	0	0	0	X	1
Scotland (McKenna / Melrose)	1	1	0	1	1	1	1	X	6

=== Draw 14 ===
Friday, March 10, 7:00 pm

Sheet A	1	2	3	4	5	6	7	8	Final
South Korea (Cho / Jeong) 🔨	2	1	0	2	1	2	0	X	8
Italy (Turra / Spelorzi)	0	0	3	0	0	0	1	X	4

Sheet C	1	2	3	4	5	6	7	8	Final
Hungary (Sasadi / Barkóczi)	0	0	3	0	3	1	1	X	8
Finland (Karjalainen / Karjalainen) 🔨	1	1	0	2	0	0	0	X	4

Sheet E	1	2	3	4	5	6	7	8	Final
England (Lenton / Pimblett) 🔨	1	0	3	0	3	0	1	0	8
Denmark (Christiansen / Brendle)	0	1	0	1	0	2	0	2	6

Sheet B	1	2	3	4	5	6	7	8	Final
Poland (Kozakiewicz / Gasik-Daszkowski) 🔨	1	0	4	0	1	0	2	0	8
Scotland (McKenna / Melrose)	0	4	0	1	0	2	0	2	9

Sheet D	1	2	3	4	5	6	7	8	Final
Norway (Iversen / Lorentsen)	2	3	1	3	0	0	1	X	10
Switzerland (Blauel / Bodenmann) 🔨	0	0	0	0	1	1	0	X	2

Sheet F	1	2	3	4	5	6	7	8	Final
Slovakia (Kunkelová / Ďuriš)	0	2	1	1	0	2	0	X	5
China (Wang / Chen) 🔨	5	0	0	0	2	0	4	X	11

== Playoffs ==
Qualification games
B2	Latvia	7
A3	Slovakia	5
A2	United States	11
B3	England	10

Semifinals
A1	China	7
B2	Latvia	10
B1	Canada	6
A2	United States	7

Final
B2	Latvia	11
A2	United States	8
Bronze medal game
A1	China	11
B1	Canada	13

=== Qualification Games ===
Saturday, March 11, 9:00 am

Sheet C	1	2	3	4	5	6	7	8	Final
Latvia (Rožkova / Lasmans) 🔨	1	0	1	0	3	2	0	X	7
Slovakia (Kunkelová / Ďuriš)	0	3	0	1	0	0	1	X	5

Sheet E	1	2	3	4	5	6	7	8	Final
United States (Wilson / Samsa) 🔨	0	4	0	2	1	0	4	0	11
England (Lenton / Pimblett)	1	0	3	0	0	5	0	1	10

=== Semifinals ===
Saturday, March 11, 7:00 pm

Sheet C	1	2	3	4	5	6	7	8	Final
Canada (Joseph / Thiessen) 🔨	1	0	2	0	0	3	0	0	6
United States (Wilson / Samsa)	0	2	0	1	1	0	2	1	7

Sheet E	1	2	3	4	5	6	7	8	Final
China (Wang / Chen) 🔨	0	3	0	0	3	0	1	X	7
Latvia (Rožkova / Lasmans)	2	0	6	1	0	1	0	X	10

=== Bronze medal game ===
Sunday, March 12, 2:30 pm

Sheet D	1	2	3	4	5	6	7	8	Final
China (Wang / Chen)	0	4	0	3	0	3	0	1	11
Canada (Joseph / Thiessen) 🔨	5	0	3	0	3	0	2	0	13

=== Final ===
Sunday, March 12, 2:30 pm

Sheet B	1	2	3	4	5	6	7	8	EE	Final
Latvia (Rožkova / Lasmans)	2	0	2	1	0	3	0	0	3	11
United States (Wilson / Samsa) 🔨	0	1	0	0	3	0	3	1	0	8

== Final standings ==
Place	Team
1st place, gold medalist(s)	Latvia
2nd place, silver medalist(s)	United States
3rd place, bronze medalist(s)	Canada
4	China
5	England
6	Slovakia
7	South Korea
8	Scotland
9	Estonia
10	Germany
11	Hungary
12	Italy
13	Japan
14	Norway
15	Sweden
16	Switzerland
17	Poland
18	Denmark
19	Finland

== See also ==
- 2023 World Wheelchair Curling Championship
