= Athletics at the 1992 Summer Paralympics – Men's 100 metres B3 =

Men's 100 metres B3 at the IX Paralympic Games
- Paralympic Athletics
- Competitors: 12 from 10 nations

Medalists
1st place, gold medalist(s)		Aldo Manganaro	Italy
2nd place, silver medalist(s)		Uwe Mehlmann	Germany
3rd place, bronze medalist(s)		Enrique Cepeda	Cuba

The Men's 100 metres B3 was a track event in athletics at the 1992 Summer Paralympics, for visually impaired athletes. It consisted of two semi-finals and a final.

== Results ==
=== Final ===
Place	Athlete	Time
1	Aldo Manganaro (ITA)	11:31
2	Uwe Mehlmann (GER)	11:35
3	Enrique Cepeda (CUB)	11:51
4	Arthur Lewis (USA)	11:51
5	David Goodman (AUS)	11:83
6	Brinley Reynolds (GBR)	12:02
7	Kurt van Raefelghem (BEL)	12:02
8	Olaf Mehlmann (GER)	12:13
