= Nathan Meyer =

South African Paralympic athlete

Medal record

Paralympic athletics

Representing South Africa

Paralympic Games
Gold medal – first place	2000 Sydney	100 metres - T13
Gold medal – first place	2000 Sydney	200 metres - T13
Silver medal – second place	2004 Athens	200 metres - T13

Nathan Meyer is a Paralympian athlete from South Africa competing mainly in category T13 sprint events.

Nathan first competed at the 2000 Summer Paralympics in the F13 long jump and won both the 100m and 200m T13 gold medals. In 2004 he attempted to defend his gold medals but finished with just a silver in the T13 200m.
