= Ingrīda Priede =

Latvian Paralympic athlete

Personal information
- Born: 8 May 1981 (age 45) Jelgava, Latvian SSR, Soviet Union
- Height: 1.61 m (5 ft 3 in)

Sport
- Country: Latvia
- Sport: Paralympic athletics
- Disability: Cerebral palsy
- Disability class: F38
- Event(s): Discus throw Shot put
Medal record
Paralympic athletics
Representing Latvia
World Championships
Gold medal – first place	2002 Lille	Discus throw F37/38
Bronze medal – third place	2006 Assen	Shot put F38
European Championships
Bronze medal – third place	2014 Swansea	Discus throw F38
Bronze medal – third place	2018 Berlin	Discus throw F38

Ingrīda Priede (born 8 May 1981) is a Latvian former Paralympic athlete who competed in international track and field competitions. She competed in discus throw and shot put, she is a World champion in shot put and a two-time European bronze medalist in discus. She competed at the 2004 and 2008 Summer Paralympics.
