= Tadashi Hoshino =

Japanese Paralympic athlete

Medal record

Paralympic athletics

Representing Japan

Paralympic Games
Silver medal – second place	2000 Sydney	4x100 metre relay - T13

Tadashi Hoshino (星野 直志, Hoshino Tadashi) is a paralympic athlete from Japan competing mainly in category T13 sprint events.

Tadashi competed in both the 100m and 200m at the 2000 Summer Paralympics but it was as part of the Japanese 4 × 100 m relay team that he won a silver medal.
