= Radoslav Ďuriš =

Slovak wheelchair curler

- Curler ♂
- Born: 10 August 1974 (age 52); Ilava

Team
- Curling club: Wheelchair Curling Club, Dubnica nad Váhom
- Skip: Radoslav Ďuriš
- Third: Peter Zaťko
- Second: Dušan Pitoňák
- Lead: Monika Kunkelová
- Alternate: Imrich Lyócsa

Curling career
- Member Association: Slovakia
- World Wheelchair Championship: 9 (2012, 2013, 2015, 2016, 2019, 2020, 2021, 2024, 2025)
- World Wheelchair Mixed Doubles Championship: 4 (2022, 2023, 2024, 2025)
- Paralympic: 4 (2014, 2018, 2022, 2026)

Radoslav Ďuriš (born 10 August 1974 in Ilava) is a Slovak wheelchair curler.

He participated at the 2014, 2018 and 2022 Winter Paralympics where Slovak team finished on sixth, ninth and fourth places respectively.

== Wheelchair curling teams and events ==
Season	Skip	Third	Second	Lead	Alternate	Coach	Events
2008–09	Radoslav Ďuriš	Dušan Pitoňák	Branislav Jakubec	Alena Kánová	Imrich Lyócsa	Pavol Pitoňák	WWhCQ 2008 (10th)
2010–11	Radoslav Ďuriš	Dušan Pitoňák	Branislav Jakubec	Alena Kánová	Monika Kunkelová	František Pitoňák	WWhCQ 2010 (6th)
2011–12	Radoslav Ďuriš	Branislav Jakubec	Dušan Pitoňák	Monika Kunkelová	Alena Kánová (WWhCC)	František Pitoňák	WWhCQ 2011 (gold); WWhCC 2012 (4th)
2012–13	Radoslav Ďuriš	Branislav Jakubec	Dušan Pitoňák	Monika Kunkelová	Alena Kánová	František Pitoňák	WWhCC 2013 (7th)
2013–14	Radoslav Ďuriš	Branislav Jakubec	Dušan Pitoňák	Monika Kunkelová	Alena Kánová	František Pitoňák	WPG 2014 (6th)
2014–15	Radoslav Ďuriš	Branislav Jakubec	Dušan Pitoňák	Monika Kunkelová	Imrich Lyócsa	František Pitoňák	WWhCC 2015 (4th)
2015–16	Radoslav Ďuriš	Dušan Pitoňák	Peter Zaťko	Monika Kunkelová	Imrich Lyócsa	František Pitoňák	WWhCC 2016 (9th)
2016–17	Radoslav Ďuriš	Dušan Pitoňák	Peter Zaťko	Monika Kunkelová	Imrich Lyócsa	František Pitoňák	WWhBCC 2016 (bronze)
2017–18	Dušan Pitoňák (fourth)	Radoslav Ďuriš (skip)	Peter Zaťko	Monika Kunkelová	Imrich Lyócsa	František Pitoňák, Pavol Pitoňák	WPG 2018 (9th)
2018–19	Radoslav Ďuriš	Dušan Pitoňák	Imrich Lyócsa	Monika Kunkelová	Peter Zaťko	František Pitoňák (WWhCC), Milan Bubenik	WWhBCC 2018 (silver); WWhCC 2019 (6th)
2019–20	Radoslav Ďuriš	Peter Zaťko	Dušan Pitoňák	Monika Kunkelová	Imrich Lyócsa	František Pitoňák	WWhCC 2020 (8th)
2020–21	Radoslav Ďuriš	Peter Zaťko	Dušan Pitoňák	Monika Kunkelová	Imrich Lyócsa	František Pitoňák	WWhCC 2021 (10th)
2021–22	Peter Zaťko (fourth)	Radoslav Ďuriš (skip)	Dušan Pitoňák	Monika Kunkelová	Alena Kánová	František Pitoňák, Milan Bubenik	WPG 2022 (4th)
2022–23	Radoslav Ďuriš	Peter Zaťko	Dušan Pitoňák	Monika Kunkelová	Adrian Ďurček	Daniela Matulová	WWhBCC 2023 (gold)
2023–24	Peter Zaťko (fourth)	Radoslav Ďuriš (skip)	Dušan Pitoňák	Monika Kunkelová	Adrian Ďurček	Daniela Matulová	WWhCC 2024 (7th)
2024–25	Radoslav Ďuriš	Peter Zaťko	Adrian Durček	Monika Kunkelová	Betty Vorosova	Daniela Matulová	WWhCC 2025 (4th)

=== Mixed doubles ===
Season	Female	Male	Coach	Events
2021–22	Monika Kunkelová	Radoslav Ďuriš	Daniela Matulová	WWhMDCC 2022 (7th)
2022–23	Monika Kunkelová	Radoslav Ďuriš	Daniela Matulová	WWhMDCC 2023 (6th)
2023–24	Monika Kunkelová	Radoslav Ďuriš	Daniela Matulová	WWhMDCC 2024 (6th)
2024–25	Monika Kunkelová	Radoslav Ďuriš	Daniela Matulová	WWhMDCC 2025 (8th)
