= Edgars Kļaviņš =

Latvian ice hockey player

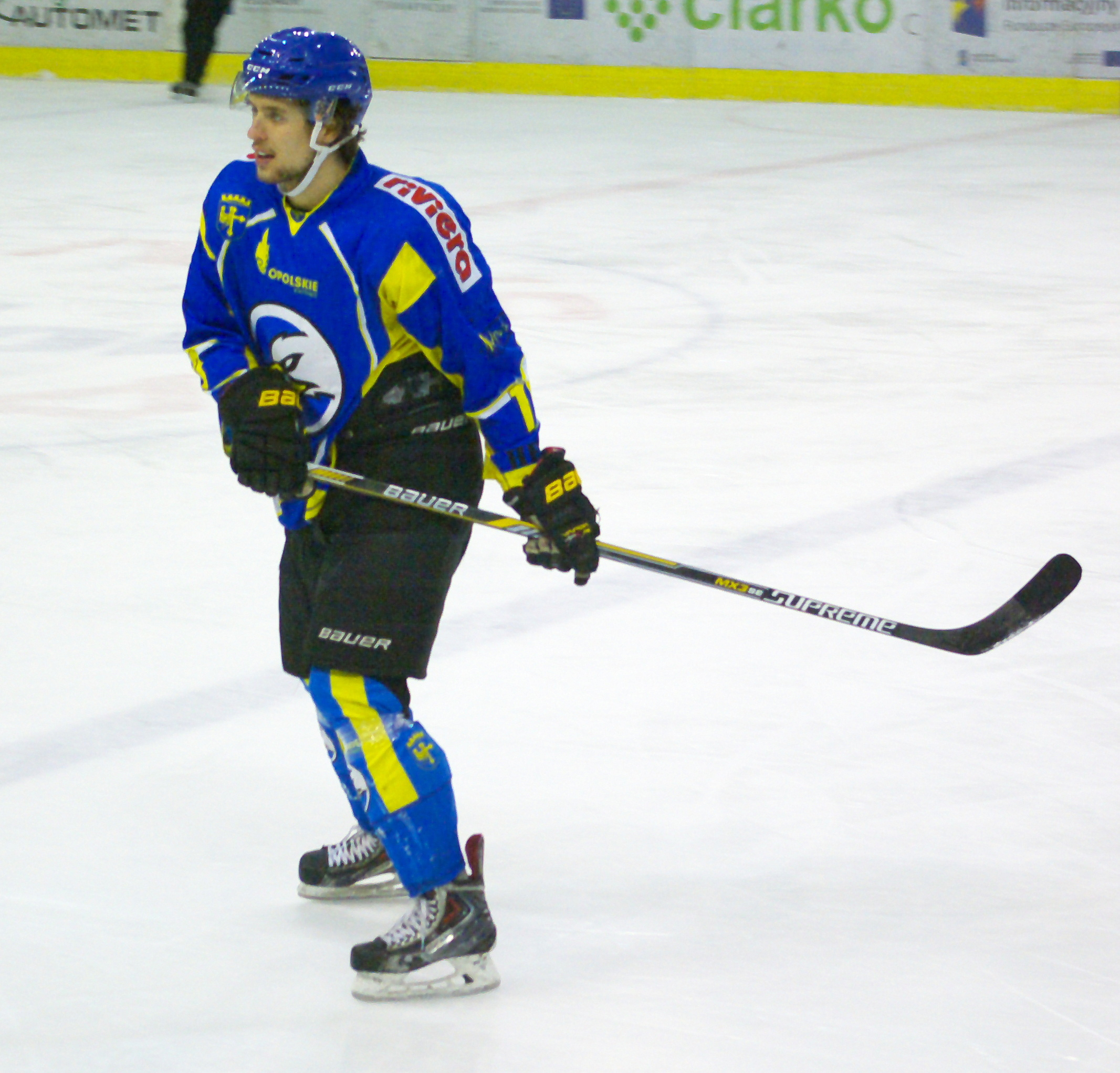
- Born: March 10, 1993 (age 32) Talsi, Latvia
- Height: 6 ft 3 in (191 cm)
- Weight: 198 lb (90 kg; 14 st 2 lb)
- Position: Right wing
- Shoots: Left
- Latvian 1. League team Former teams: Venta 2002; SDE HF; Lidingö Vikings; AIK; Vallentuna; Timrå; Troja/Ljungby; Kallinge-Ronneby; Beibarys Atyrau; Polonia Bytom; Orlik Opole
- Playing career: 2008–present

Edgars Cgojevs (till 2015 known as Kļaviņš) (born March 3, 1993) is a Latvian professional ice hockey right winger, currently playing for Venta 2002 in the Latvian 1. League.

== Career statistics ==
=== Regular season and playoffs ===
			Regular season					Playoffs
Season	Team	League	GP	G	A	Pts	PIM	GP	G	A	Pts	PIM
2008–09	SDE HF	J18	5	2	0	2	4	—	—	—	—	—
2009–10	SDE HF	J18	9	3	8	11	4	—	—	—	—	—
2009–10	Lidingö Vikings	J18	20	24	25	49	10	6	11	17	28	0
2009–10	Lidingö Vikings	Swe-4	3	0	1	1	0	—	—	—	—	—
2010–11	Lidingö Vikings	J18	33	33	25	58	41	2	0	0	0	0
2010–11	Lidingö Vikings	Swe-4	26	14	26	40	14	9	4	5	9	8
2011–12	AIK	J20	41	11	10	21	2	3	0	0	0	0
