= Equestrian at the 2020 Summer Paralympics – Individual championship test grade I =

Equestrian – Individual championship test, grade I at the XVI Paralympic Games
- Venue: Olympic Equestrian Centre
- Date: 26 August 2021
- Competitors: 18 from 14 nations
- Winning score: 81.464

Medalists
1st place, gold medalist(s)		Roxanne Trunnell	United States
2nd place, silver medalist(s)		Rihards Snikus	Latvia
3rd place, bronze medalist(s)		Sara Morganti	Italy

The individual championship test, grade I, para-equestrian dressage event at the 2020 Summer Paralympics was held on August 26, 2021 at the Olympic Equestrian Centre in Tokyo.

The competition was assessed by a ground jury composed of five judges placed at locations designated E, H, C, M, and B. Each judge rated the competitors' performances with a percentage score. The five scores from the jury were then averaged to determine a rider's total percentage score.

== Classification ==
Grade I riders are described by the IPC as athletes who "have severe impairments affecting all limbs and the trunk". Such athletes will commonly require a wheelchair in daily life, and compete in walking only.

== Results ==
Individual championship test - Class 1
Rank	Team	Rider and Horse	Scores					Final Total	FSQ
Rank	Team	Rider and Horse	E	H	C	M	B	Final Total	FSQ
1st place, gold medalist(s)	United States	Roxanne Trunnell on Dolton	82.679	79.464	81.071	79.107	85	81.464	Q
2nd place, silver medalist(s)	Latvia	Rihards Snikus on King Of The Dance	80.536	80.536	76.786	79.643	83.393	80.179	Q
3rd place, bronze medalist(s)	Italy	Sara Morganti on Royal Delight	77.143	76.429	76.25	77.5	77.5	76.964	Q
4	Norway	Jens Lasse Dokkan on Aladdin	76.607	73.214	76.429	78.393	75	75.929	Q
5	Singapore	Laurentia Tan on Banestro	77.679	74.464	70.357	74.643	72.679	73.964	Q
6	Finland	Katja Karjalainen on Dr Doolittle	74.107	72.5	73.929	74.107	64.821	71.893	Q
7	Austria	Julia Sciancalepore on Heinrich Iv	70.179	72.321	69.286	69.821	71.25	70.571	Q
8	RPC	Vladislav Pronskiy on Silva Le Andro	73.214	70.179	68.929	71.071	68.75	70.429	Q
9	Canada	Winona Hartvikson on Onyx	70.536	66.607	69.107	72.321	70.893	69.893	
10	Brazil	Sergio Froes Ribeiro De Oliva on Milenium	70	69.107	68.214	74.107	66.786	69.643	
11	Canada	Jody Schloss on Lieutenant Lobin	69.107	70.357	65.536	67.679	73.75	69.286	
12	Italy	Carola Semperboni on Paul	68.214	66.25	67.143	66.964	69.821	67.678	
13	Czech Republic	Anastasja Vistalova on Sterngreifer	66.786	63.214	67.857	68.036	68.929	66.964	
14	Portugal	Ana Isabel Mota Veiga on Convicto	68.036	65.179	61.786	64.464	68.036	65.5	
15	France	Anne Frederique Royon on Quaterboy Lh	65.179	68.036	66.25	61.786	65.536	65.357	
16	Hong Kong	Pui Ting Natasha Tse on Baxo	64.107	64.643	62.143	63.929	64.107	63.786	
17	Singapore	Gemma Foo on Gambler	65.179	60.179	63.214	63.393	61.786	62.75	
18	Ireland	Michael Murphy on Cleverboy	62.893	61.107	61.821	59.143	62.179	61.429	

- WD : withdrawn
