= Enrique Cepeda =

Cuban Paralympic athlete

Medal record

Paralympic athletics

Representing Cuba

Paralympic Games
| Gold medal – first place | 1992 Barcelona | Triple Jump - B3 |
| Gold medal – first place | 2000 Sydney | Long Jump - F13 |
| Silver medal – second place | 2004 Athens | 4x100 metre relay - T11-13 |
| Bronze medal – third place | 1992 Barcelona | 100 metres - B3 |

Enrique Cepeda is a paralympic athlete from Cuba competing mainly in category F12 long and triple jump events.

== Biography ==
Enrique has competed in three Paralympics winning medals at each games. His first games were in 1992 where as well as competing in the 200m and long jump he won a bronze in the 100m and gold in the triple jump. After missing the 1996 games he returned in 2000 in Sydney competing in the 100m and winning a gold medal in the F13 long jump. He followed this up in 2004 with competing in both the long and triple jump and assisting the Cuban T11-13 4 × 100 m to a silver medal.
