= Riaan Liebenberg =

South African Paralympic athlete

Medal record

Paralympic athletics

Representing South Africa

Paralympic Games
Silver medal – second place	2000 Sydney	400 metres - T13

Riaan Liebenberg is a paralympic athlete from South Africa competing mainly in category T13 sprints events.

Riian competed in the 100m, 200m and 400m in the T13 class at the 2000 Summer Paralympics winning a silver medal in the 400m.
