= Ieva Melle =

Latvian Paralympic archer (born 1985)

Personal information
- Nationality: Latvian
- Born: 1 April 1985 (age 41) Smiltene, Latvian SSR, Soviet Union

Sport
- Sport: Archery
- Event: Recurve
- Coached by: Eduards Lapsins
Medal record
Representing Latvia
Dutch Para Archery Tournament
Silver medal – second place	2015 Almere	Mixed recurve team open
Bronze medal – third place	2015 Almere	Women's recurve open

Ieva Melle (born 1 April 1985) is a Latvian Paralympic archer.

== Career ==
She has competed once at the Summer Paralympics and made appearances in the World Para Archery Championships and World Cup Stages. She specialises in making jewellery.

Melle's performance in the 2015 World Archery Para Championships saw her qualify for the 2016 Summer Paralympics, her debut games. She earned the spot in the women's recurve open after defeating Czech archer Marketa Sidkova in straight sets.
