= Aldo Manganaro =

Italian Paralympic athlete

Medal record

Paralympic athletics

Representing Italy

Paralympic Games
Gold medal – first place	1992 Barcelona	100 metres - B3
Gold medal – first place	1996 Atlanta	100 metres - T12
Gold medal – first place	2000 Sydney	4x100 metre relay - T13
Silver medal – second place	1992 Barcelona	200 metres - B3
Silver medal – second place	1996 Atlanta	200 metres - T12
Bronze medal – third place	1988 Seoul	100 metres - B3
Bronze medal – third place	1992 Barcelona	4x400 metre relay - B1>B3
Bronze medal – third place	1996 Atlanta	400 metres - T12
Bronze medal – third place	2000 Sydney	100 metres - T13

Aldo Manganaro is a paralympic athlete from Italy competing mainly in category T13 sprint events.

== Biography ==
Aldo has competed at five Paralympics winning a total of nine medals. He first competed in the 1988 Summer Paralympics where he took part in both the long and triple jump and won a bronze medal in the 100m. By the 1992 Summer Paralympics he had moved further to the sprints winning gold in the 100m, silver 200m and bronze in the 400m as well as being part of the Italian 4 × 100 m and 4 × 400 m relay teams, the later also winning a bronze. In 1996 Italy didn't enter relay teams but Aldo did win a second consecutive 100m gold and 200m silver as well as winning a bronze in the 400m. In 2000 Aldo again competed in the three sprints but could only manage a bronze in the 100m until he teamed up in the 4 × 100 m with his Italian teammates to win the gold medal. 2008 proved even less successful as he was unable to win any medals in the 100 or 200m.
