= 2018 World Wheelchair-B Curling Championship =

Wheelchair curling championship

- Host city: Lohja, Finland
- Arena: Kisakallio Sports Institute
- Dates: November 9–15, 2018
- Winner: Estonia
- Skip: Viljar Villiste
- Fourth: Andrei Koitmae
- Second: Ain Villau
- Lead: Signe Falkenberg
- Alternate: Mait Matas
- Coach: Erkki Lill
- Finalist: Slovakia (Ďuriš)

The 2018 World Wheelchair-B Curling Championship, was held from November 9 to 15, 2018 at the Kisakallio Sports Institute in Lohja, Finland. The qualification event is open to any World Curling Federation member nation not already qualified for the 2019 World Wheelchair Curling Championship. The event's three medalists, Estonia, Slovakia, and Latvia, join the host and the top eight finishers from the last World Wheelchair Curling Championship at this season's event in Stirling, Scotland.

== Round robin standings ==
Key
Teams to Playoffs

Group A	Skip	W	L
Slovakia	Radoslav Ďuriš	6	0
Czech Republic	Radek Musilek	4	2
Estonia	Viljar Villiste	4	2
Italy	Paolo Ioriatti	3	3
England	Rosemary Lenton	2	4
Slovenia	Ziga Bajde	2	4
Turkey	Kenan Coskun	0	6

Group B	Skip	W	L
Latvia	Polina Rozkova	5	1
Sweden	Viljo Petersson-Dahl	5	1
Finland	Yrjo Jaaskelainen	4	2
Lithuania	Andrej Daskevic	3	3
Denmark	Kenneth Ørbæk	2	4
Poland	Maciej Karas	1	5
Japan	Hiroshi Wachi	1	5

== Playoffs ==
Qualification Games
B2	Sweden	6
A3	Estonia	9
A2	Czech Republic	3
B3	Finland	10

Semi-finals
B1	Latvia	3
A3	Estonia	4
A1	Slovakia	9
B3	Finland	5

Finals
A3	Estonia	7
A1	Slovakia	3

Bronze Medal Game
B1	Latvia	6
B3	Finland	5
