= Armands Ližbovskis =

Latvian Paralympic athlete (born 1968)

Medal record

Track and field (athletics)

Representing Latvia

Paralympic Games
Bronze medal – third place	2000 Sydney	Long Jump - F13

Armands Ližbovskis (born 18 November 1968) is a Paralympian athlete from Latvia competing mainly in F13 (classification) long jump events.

== Career ==
Ližbovskis has competed in three Paralympics. In the 1992 Summer Paralympics in Barcelona, Spain he competed in the 100m, 200m, long jump and triple jump. In the 1996 Summer Paralympics in Atlanta, United States again competing in the 100m, 200m, long jump and triple jump. His best achievement came in the 2000 Summer Paralympics in Athens, Greece where he competed in the 100m and 200m and won a bronze medal in the long jump.
