= Edgars Bergs =

Latvian Paralympic athlete

Medal record

Paralympic athletics

Representing Latvia

Paralympic Games
Silver medal – second place	2004 Athens	Shot Put - F35
Silver medal – second place	2008 Beijing	Shot Put - F35/F36
Bronze medal – third place	2004 Athens	Discus Throw - F35
Bronze medal – third place	2016 Rio de Janeiro	Shot put - F35

IPC Athletics World Championships
Silver medal – second place	2015 Doha	Shot put – F35

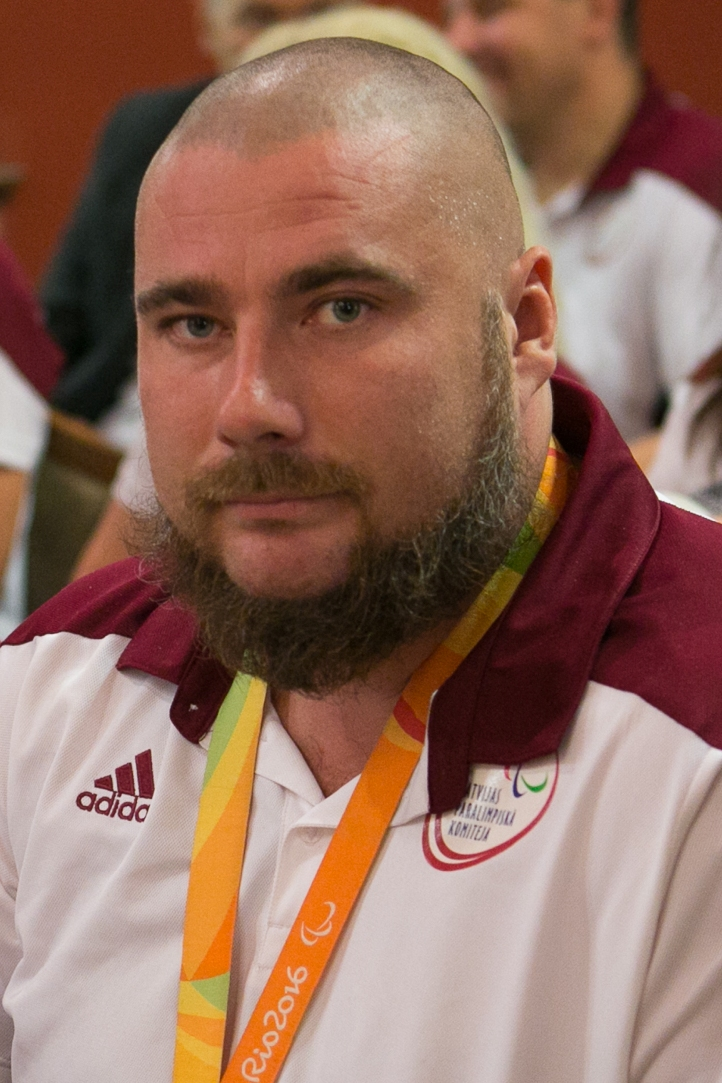
Edgars Bergs in 2016

Edgars Bergs (born 15 September 1984 in Saldus) is a Paralympian athlete from Latvia competing mainly in category F35 throws events.

Edgars competed in the shot put and discus in both 2004 Summer Paralympics and 2008 Summer Paralympics picking up a bronze in the F35 discus and silver in the F35 shot put in Athens and a silver in the F35/36 shot put in Beijing.
