= Rihards Snikus =

Latvian Paralympic equestrian

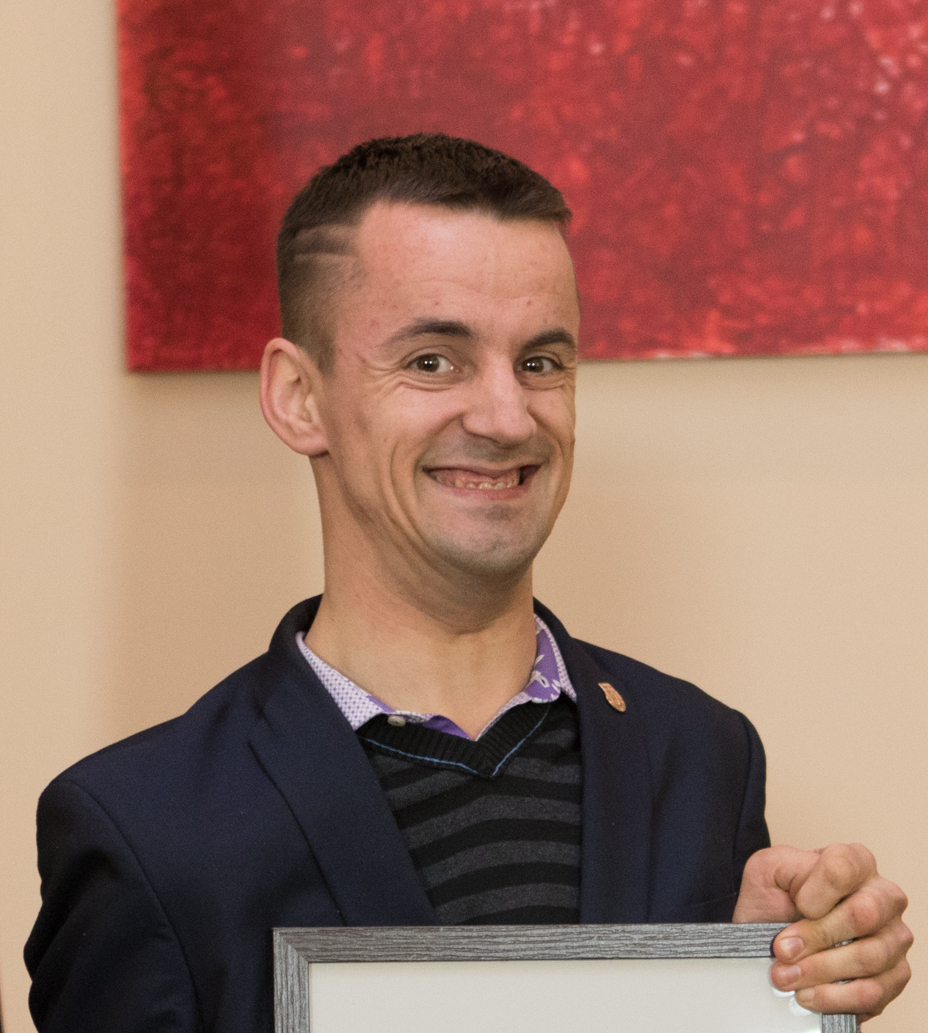
- Rihards Snikus in 2019

Personal information
- Nationality: Latvian
- Born: 25 March 1988 (age 38) Riga, Latvian SSR, Soviet Union

Sport
- Country: Latvia
- Sport: Equestrian
Medal record
Paralympic Games
Gold medal – first place	2024 Paris	Individual championship test grade I
Gold medal – first place	2024 Paris	Individual freestyle test grade I
Silver medal – second place	2020 Tokyo	Individual championship test grade I
Silver medal – second place	2020 Tokyo	Individual freestyle test grade I

Rihards Snikus (born 25 March 1988 in Riga) is a Latvian Paralympic equestrian and DJ. He won silver medals at the 2020 Paralympic Games in the Individual freestyle test grade I, and in the Individual championship test grade I. In 2024 he became the first ever Latvian equestrian to win individual gold at the Paris 2024 Paralympic Games with his horse King of the Dance.

He competed at the 2017 European Championship in Gothenburg, Sweden, and in the 2018 World Equestrian Games.
