= Aigars Apinis =

Latvian Paralympic athlete

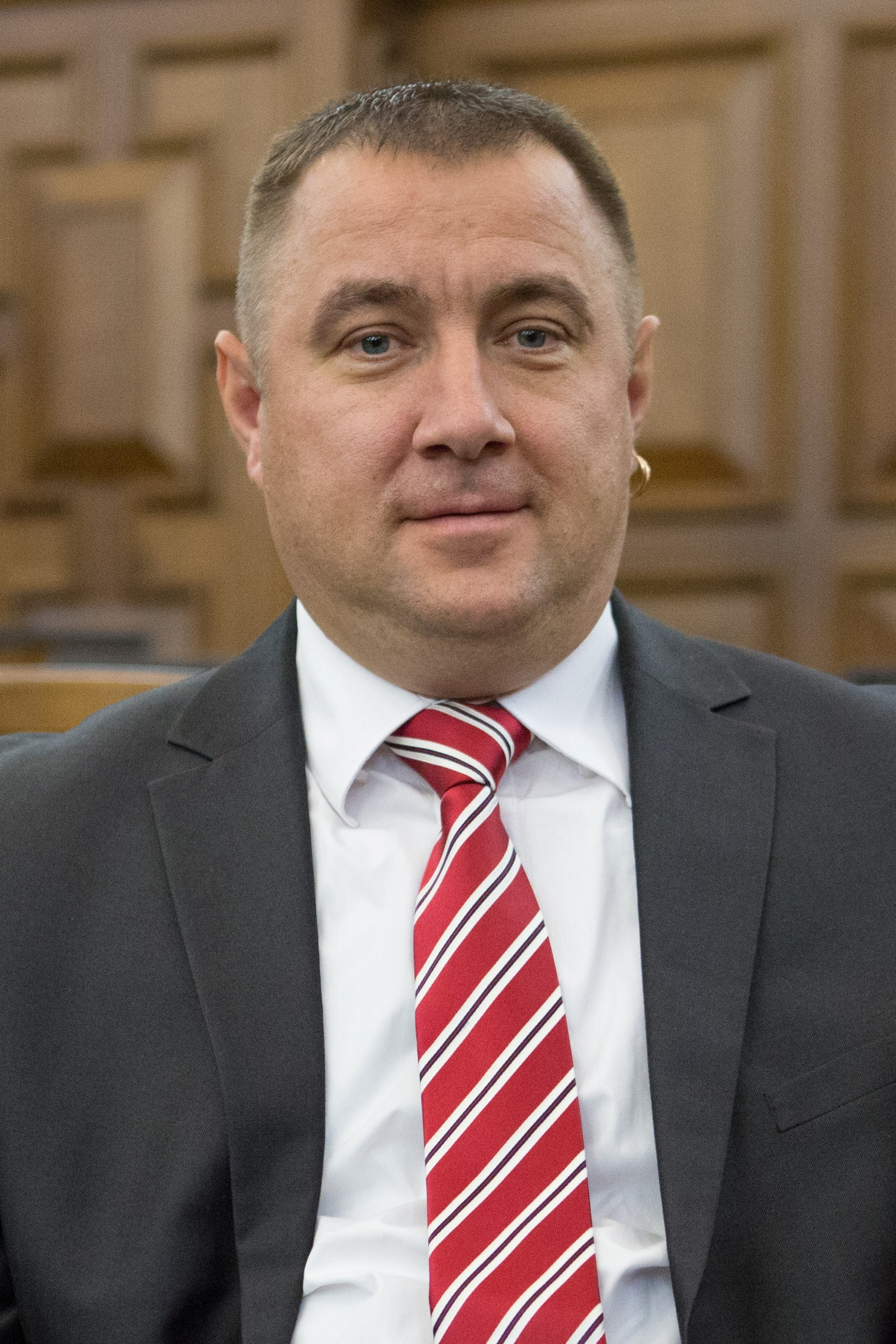
- Apinis in 2015

Personal information
- Nationality: Latvian
- Born: 9 June 1973 (age 53) Aizkraukle, Latvian SSR, Soviet Union

Sport
- Country: Latvia
- Sport: Athletics
- Events: Shot put Discus throw
- Coached by: Aldi Supulnieks

Achievements and titles
- Paralympic finals: 2000, 2004, 2008, 2012, 2016 2020
Medal record
Men's para-athletics
Representing Latvia
Paralympic Games
Gold medal – first place	2004 Athens	Discus throw F52
Gold medal – first place	2008 Beijing	Discus throw F33–34/52
Gold medal – first place	2012 London	Shot put F52/53
Gold medal – first place	2016 Rio de Janeiro	Discus throw F51/52
Silver medal – second place	2008 Beijing	Shot put F33–34/52
Silver medal – second place	2012 London	Discus throw F51–F53
Silver medal – second place	2024 Paris	Discus throw F52
Bronze medal – third place	2000 Sydney	Discus throw F52
Bronze medal – third place	2000 Sydney	Shot put F52
Bronze medal – third place	2020 Tokyo	Discus throw F52
World Championships
Gold medal – first place	2002 Lille	Discus – F52
Gold medal – first place	2006 Assen	Discus – F52
Gold medal – first place	2011 Christchurch	Discus – F52/53/54
Gold medal – first place	2011 Christchurch	Shot put – F52/53
Gold medal – first place	2013 Lyons	Shot put – F52/53
Gold medal – first place	2015 Doha	Discus – F52
Gold medal – first place	2019 Dubai	Discus – F52
Gold medal – first place	2025 New Delhi	Discus – F52
Silver medal – second place	2017 London	Discus throw – F52
Silver medal – second place	2023 Paris	Discus – F52
Bronze medal – third place	2006 Assen	Shot put – F52
Bronze medal – third place	2013 Lyons	Discus – F52
European Championships
Gold medal – first place	2014 Swansea	Discus throw – F52

Aigars Apinis (born 9 June 1973) is a Latvian athlete. He participates in F52 class which means he has limited finger movement and no trunk or leg function.

On July 3, 1992, he suffered a severe cervical vertebrae injury while jumping into the water.

He started to practice in 1998, but already at the 2000 Summer Paralympics he won two bronze medals – in discus throw and shot put. At the 2004 Summer Paralympics he became the Olympic champion in discus throw and was 4th in shot put. Apinis won the gold medal in discus throw at the 2016 Summer Paralympics. At the 2020 Summer Paralympics, he won a bronze medal in Men's discus throw F52.

== Career ==
In the fall of 2010 Apinis created resonance in the society, by stating that he is ready to sell his 2000 Sydney Paralympics bronze medal (first paralympic medal in the history of Latvia) in an auction, in order to provide Latvian Paralympic Committee with funds, which would allow Latvian delegation to participate in the 2011 IPC Athletics World Championships.

At the 2011 IPC (International Paralympic Committee) World Championships in New Zealand, Apinis won the gold medal in the shot put F52/53 category, also setting a new world record for his category.
