= Latvian Paralympic Committee =

National Paralympic Committee of Latvia

National Paralympic Committee
- Country: Latvia
- Code: LAT
- Continental association: EPC
- President: Ms. Daiga Dadzīte
- Secretary General: Mr. Aldis Šūpulnieks
- Website: www.lpkomiteja.lv

The Latvian Paralympic Committee (LPC, Latvian: Latvijas Paralimpiskā komiteja) is responsible for Latvia's participation in the Paralympic Games.

== Structure ==
- President: Ms. Daiga Dadzīte

== See also ==
- Latvia at the Paralympics
- Latvian Olympic Committee
