= Chronological summary of the 2014 Winter Paralympics =

This article contains a chronological summary of major events from the 2014 Winter Paralympics, which took place in Sochi, Russia.

All times are in Moscow Time (UTC+4).

== Calendar ==
OC	Opening ceremony	●	Event competitions	#	Event finals	CC	Closing ceremony

March	7th Fri	8th Sat	9th Sun	10th Mon	11th Tue	12th Wed	13th Thu	14th Fri	15th Sat	16th Sun	Events
Ceremonies	OC									CC	
Alpine skiing		6	3	3	●	3	3	8	3	3	32
Biathlon		6			6			6			18
Cross-country skiing			2	4		6			2	6	20
Ice sledge hockey		●	●		●	●	●	●	1		1
Wheelchair curling		●	●	●	●	●	●	●	1		1
Total events		12	5	7	6	9	3	14	7	9	72
Cumulative total		12	17	24	30	39	42	56	63	72	
March	7th Fri	8th Sat	9th Sun	10th Mon	11th Tue	12th Wed	13th Thu	14th Fri	15th Sat	16th Sun	Events

== Day 1 − Friday 7 March ==
Opening ceremony

- The opening ceremony took place at the Fisht Olympic Stadium. The ceremony included the lighting of the Paralympic Cauldron, as well as the athlete's parade. In response to Russia's military intervention, Ukraine only sent their flag bearer, Mykhaylo Thackenko, into the ceremony, with the others remaining outside in protest. There were huge cheers when Ukraine was announced, however.

== Day 2 − Saturday 8 March ==
Alpine skiing

- Women's downhill
  - In the visually impaired event, Henrieta Farkasova and guide Natalia Subrtova (Slovakia) won the gold medal. Jade Etherington and guide Caroline Powell (Great Britain) finished second, and Russia's Aleksandra Frantceva and guide Pavel Zabotin finished third.
  - In the standing event, Marie Bochet (France) recorded a time of 1:30.72 to win the gold medal. Inga Medvedeva (Russia) finished second, with Allison Jones (USA) in third.
  - In the sitting event, Anna Schaffelhuber (Germany) recorded a time of 1:35.55 to finish with the gold medal. Alana Nichols (USA) finished just 0.14 seconds behind for silver, with Laurie Stephens (also USA) taking bronze.
- Men's downhill
  - In the visually impaired event, Yon Santacana Maiztegui and guide Miguel Galindo Garces (Spain) finished with the gold medal. Miroslav Haraus and guide Maros Hudik (Slovakia) finished second, with Mac Marcoux and guide Robin Femy (Canada) third.
  - In the standing event, Markus Salcher (Australia) took the gold medal, with Alexey Bugaev (Russia) in second. Vincent Gauthier-Manuel (France) finished third.
  - In the sitting event, Akira Kano and Takeshi Suzuki (both Japan) won gold and bronze respectively. Josh Dueck (Canada) finished with the silver medal.

Biathlon

- Women's 6km
  - In the visually impaired event, Russia won both gold and silver medals, with Mikhalina Lysova and guide Alexey Ivanov first and Iuliia Budeleeva and guide Tatiana Malkseva second. Oksana Shyshkova and guide Lada Nesterenko (Ukraine) finished third.
  - In the sitting event, Andrea Eskau (Germany) finished first with no misses, and a calculated time of 19:12.4. Russia's Svetlana Konovalova finished second, 18.7 seconds behind, and Olena Iurkovska (Ukraine) finished third.
  - In the standing event, Russia took the gold and silver medals. Alena Kaufman finished first, with Anna Milenina second. Iuliia Betenkova (Ukraine) finished third.
- Men's 7.5km
  - In the visually impaired event, Vitaliy Lukyanenko and guide Borys Babar (Ukraine) finished with gold medals. Nikolay Polukhin and guide Andrey Tokarev (Russia) finished second, with Vasili Shaptsiaboi and guide Mikhail Lebedzeu (Belarus) third.
  - In the sitting event, Russian Roman Petushkov finished with no misses in first. Maksym Yarovyi (Ukraine) finished second and Kozo Kubo (Japan) third, both also with no misses.
  - In the standing event, Canadian Mark Arendz finished second, 0.7 seconds behind Vladislav Lekomtcev (Russia), who won gold. The next three places were all filled by Russian athletes, with Azat Karachurin winning the bronze medal.

Ice sledge hockey

- Preliminary round, Group A
  - Czech Republic 1-2 Norway
  - Canada 10-1 Sweden
- Preliminary round, Group B
  - United States 5-1 Italy
  - Russia 2-3 South Korea

Wheelchair curling

- Round robin, draw 1
  - South Korea 0-10 Norway
  - Canada 6-3 Great Britain
  - Slovakia 6-4 United States
  - Russia 5-4 China
- Round robin, draw 2
  - Norway 3-7 China
  - Sweden 7-6 Finland
  - United States 5-9 South Korea
  - Canada 5-4 Russia

Gold medalists
Sport	Event		Competitor(s)	NPC	Rec	Ref
Alpine skiing	Women's downhill	Visually Impaired	Henrieta Farkasova; Guide: Natalia Subrtova	Slovakia		
Alpine skiing	Women's downhill	Sitting	Anna Schaffelhuber	Germany		
Alpine skiing	Women's downhill	Standing	Marie Bochet	France		
Alpine skiing	Men's downhill	Visually Impaired	Jon Santacana Maiztegui; Guide: Miguel Galindo Garces	Spain		
Alpine skiing	Men's downhill	Sitting	Akira Kano	Japan		
Alpine skiing	Men's downhill	Standing	Markus Salcher	Austria		
Biathlon	Women's 6km	Visually Impaired	Mikhalina Lysova; Guide: Alexey Ivanov	Russia		
Biathlon	Women's 6km	Sitting	Andrea Eskau	Germany		
Biathlon	Women's 6km	Standing	Alena Kaufman	Russia		
Biathlon	Men's 7.5km	Visually Impaired	Vitaliy Lukyanenko; Guide: Borys Babar	Ukraine		
Biathlon	Men's 7.5km	Sitting	Roman Petushkov	Russia		
Biathlon	Men's 7.5km	Standing	Vladislav Lekomtcev	Russia		

== Day 3 − Sunday 9 March ==
Alpine skiing

- Men's super-G
  - In the visually impaired event, Jakub Krako and guide Martin Motyka (Slovakia) won the gold medal. Mark Bathum and guide Cade Yarmamoto (USA) finished second and Russia's Mac Marcoux and guide Robin Femy finished third.
  - In the standing event, Markus Salcher and Matthias Lanzinger (both Austria) finished first and second respectively, with Alexey Bugaev (Russia) in third.
  - In the sitting event, Japan's Akira Kano and Taiki Morii finished with the gold and silver medias, while Caleb Brousseau (Canada) finished third.

Cross-country skiing

- In the men's 15km sitting event, Roman Petushkov (Russia) finished with the gold medal, Irek Zaripov (Russia) finished second and Aleksandr Davidovich (Russia) finished third.
- In the women's 12km sitting event, Lyudmyla Pavlenko (Ukraine) won gold, Oksana Masters (USA) won silver and Svetlana Konovalova (Russia) finished third.

Ice sledge hockey

- Preliminary round, Group A
  - Czech Republic 2-1 Sweden
  - Canada 4-0 Norway
- Preliminary round, Group B
  - United States 3-0 South Korea
  - Russia 7-0 Italy

Wheelchair curling

- Round robin, draw 3
  - Sweden 4-6 Great Britain
  - United States 8-5 Norway
  - China 3-8 Slovakia
  - Finland 4-7 Russia
- Round robin, draw 4
  - Canada 7-4 Sweden
  - Finland 6-9 Slovakia
  - Great Britain 8-4 South Korea

Gold medalists
Sport	Event		Competitor(s)	NPC	Rec	Ref
Alpine skiing	Men's super-G	Visually Impaired	Jaku Krako; Guide: Martin Motyka	Slovakia		
Alpine skiing	Men's super-G	Sitting	Akira Kano	Japan		
Alpine skiing	Men's super-G	Standing	Markus Salcher	Austria		
Cross-country skiing	Men's 15km	Sitting	Roman Petushkov	Russia		
Cross-country skiing	Women's 12km	Sitting	Lyudmyla Pavlenko	Ukraine		

== Day 4 − Monday 10 March ==
Alpine skiing

- Women's super-G
  - In the visually impaired competition, Kelly Gallagher and guide Charlotte Evans (Great Britain) won gold with a time of 1:28.72. 0.22 seconds behind was Aleksandra Frantceva (Russia) with guide Pavel Zabotin. Jade Etherington and guide Caroline Powell (also Great Britain) finished third.
  - In the sitting event, Anna Schaffelhuber (Germany) finished with the gold medal. Claudia Loesch (Austria) finished second, with Laurie Stephens (USA) third.
  - In the standing event, Marie Bochet (France) won the gold medal, with Solène Jambaqué (also France) in second. Stephanie Jallen (USA) finished third.

Cross-country skiing

- Men's 20km
  - In the standing event, Russians Rushan Minnegulov and Vladislav Lekomtcev finished first and third respectively. Ilkka Tuomisto (Finland) finished second.
  - In the visually impaired event, Brian McKeever and guide Graham Nishikawa (Canada) finished first, with Stanislav Chohlaev and guide Maksim Pirogov (Russia) second. Zebastian Modin and guide Albin Ackerot (Sweden) finished with the bronze medal.
- Women's 15km
  - In the standing event, Helene Ripa (Canada) finished first, with Ukrainian Iuliia Batenkova second. Anna Milenina (Russia) finished third.
  - In the visually impaired event, Elena Remizova and guide Natalia Yakimova (Russia) finished first, with Mikhalina Lysova and guide Alexey Ivanhov (also Russia) second. Yadviha Skorabahataya and guide Iryna Nafranovich (Belarus) finished third.

Wheelchair curling

- Round robin, draw 5
  - South Korea 5-7 Russia
  - Finland 6-8 Norway
  - United States 2-7 Canada
  - China 8-4 Sweden
- Round robin, draw 6
  - Slovakia 2-12 Great Britain
  - South Korea 2-11 China
  - Canada 6-8 Norway
  - Russia 6-5 United States

Gold medalists
Sport	Event		Competitor(s)	NPC	Rec	Ref
Alpine skiing	Women's super-G	Visually Impaired	Kelly Gallagher; Guide: Charlotte Evans	Great Britain		
Alpine skiing	Women's super-G	Sitting	Anna Schaffelhuber	Germany		
Alpine skiing	Women's super-G	Standing	Marie Bochet	France		
Cross-country skiing	Men's 20km	Standing	Rushan Minnegulov	Russia		
Cross-country skiing	Men's 20km	Visually impaired	Brian McKeever; Guide: Graham Nishikawa	Canada		
Cross-country skiing	Women's 15km	Standing	Helene Ripa	Sweden		
Cross-country skiing	Women's 15km	Visually impaired	Elena Remizona; Guide: Natalia Yakimova	Russia		

== Day 5 − Tuesday 11 March ==
Alpine skiing

- Women's combined
  - In the visually impaired competition, Aleksandra Frantceva and guide Pavel Zabotin (Russia) won gold with a time of 2:27.75. 0.63 seconds behind was Jade Etherington (Great Britain) with guide Caroline Powell. Danelle Umstead and guide Robert Umstead (USA) finished third.
  - In the sitting event, Anna Schaffelhuber (Germany) finished with the gold medal. Anna-Lena Forster (also Germany) finished second.
  - In the standing event, Marie Bochet (France) won the gold medal, with Andrea Rothfuss (Germany) in second. Stephanie Jallen (USA) finished third.
- Men's combined
  - Visually impaired, standing and sitting

Biathlon

- Men's 12.5km
  - Visually impaired, standing and sitting
- Women's 10km
  - Visually impaired, standing and sitting

Ice sledge hockey

- Preliminary round, Group A
  - Norway 2-0 Sweden
  - Canada 1-0 Czech Republic
- Preliminary round, Group B
  - South Korea 1-2 Italy
  - United States 1-2 Russia

Wheelchair curling

- Round robin, draw 7
  - Russia 7-4 Sweden
  - Great Britain 6-8 Finland
  - South Korea 2-7 Slovakia
- Round robin, draw 8
  - Norway 3-7 Great Britain
  - Sweden 9-3 Slovakia
  - China 5-8 Canada
  - United States 7-6 Finland

Gold medalists
Sport	Event		Competitor(s)	NPC	Rec	Ref
Biathlon	Women's 10km	Visually Impaired				
Biathlon	Women's 10km	Sitting				
Biathlon	Women's 10km	Standing				
Biathlon	Men's 12.5km	Visually Impaired				
Biathlon	Men's 12.5km	Sitting				
Biathlon	Men's 12.5km	Standing				
