= Sweden at the 2014 Winter Paralympics =

- IPC code: SWE
- NPC: Swedish Parasports Federation

in Sochi
- Competitors: 22 in 5 sports
- Flag bearer: Jalle Jungnell
- Medals Ranked 11th: Gold 1 Silver 2 Bronze 1 Total 4

Winter Paralympics appearances (overview)
- 1976; 1980; 1984; 1988; 1992; 1994; 1998; 2002; 2006; 2010; 2014; 2018; 2022; 2026

Sweden competed at the 2014 Winter Paralympics in Sochi, Russia from the 7–16 March 2014.

== Medalists ==
Medal	Name	Sport	Event	Date
Gold	Helene Ripa	Cross-country skiing	Women's 15 km classical standing	10 March
Silver	Zebastian Modin; Guide: Albin Ackerot	Cross-country skiing	Men's 1 km sprint classical visually impaired	12 March
Silver	Zebastian Modin; Guide: Albin Ackerot; Helene Ripa	Cross-country skiing	Mixed Relay	15 March
Bronze	Zebastian Modin; Guide: Albin Ackerot	Cross-country skiing	Men's 20 km classical visually impaired	10 March

== Alpine skiing ==
Women

Athlete	Event	Run 1		Run 2		Total	
Athlete	Event	Time	Rank	Time	Rank	Time	Rank
Linnea Ottosson Eide	Slalom sitting	DNF					
Linnea Ottosson Eide	Giant slalom sitting	2:13.10	12	1:52.19	11	4:05.29	11

== Biathlon ==
Men

Athlete	Event	Time	Misses	Rank
Zebastian Modin; Guide: Albin Ackerot	7.5 kilometres visually impaired	22:18.1	0+2	8

== Cross-country skiing ==
Men's distance

Athlete	Event	Final	
Athlete	Event	Time	Rank
Zebastian Modin; Guide: Albin Ackerot	10 km free visually impaired	25:16.5	6
Zebastian Modin; Guide: Albin Ackerot	20 km classical visually impaired	56:34.9	3rd place, bronze medalist(s)

Women's distance

Athlete	Event	Final	
Athlete	Event	Time	Rank
Helene Ripa	5 km free standing	16:24.5	15
Helene Ripa	15 km classical standing	49:49.2	1st place, gold medalist(s)

Relay

Athletes	Event	Final	
Athletes	Event	Time	Rank
Helene Ripa; Zebastian Modin; Guide: Albin Ackerot	4 x 2.5km mixed relay	27:44.3	2nd place, silver medalist(s)

Sprint

Athlete	Event	Qualification		Quarterfinal		Semifinal		Final	
Athlete	Event	Time	Rank	Time	Rank	Time	Rank	Time	Rank
Zebastian Modin	Men's sprint visually impaired	3:37.04	3 Q	—N/a		4:11.6	1 Q	4:01.4	2nd place, silver medalist(s)
Helene Ripa	Women's sprint standing	5:50.15	15	Did Not advance					

== Ice sledge hockey ==
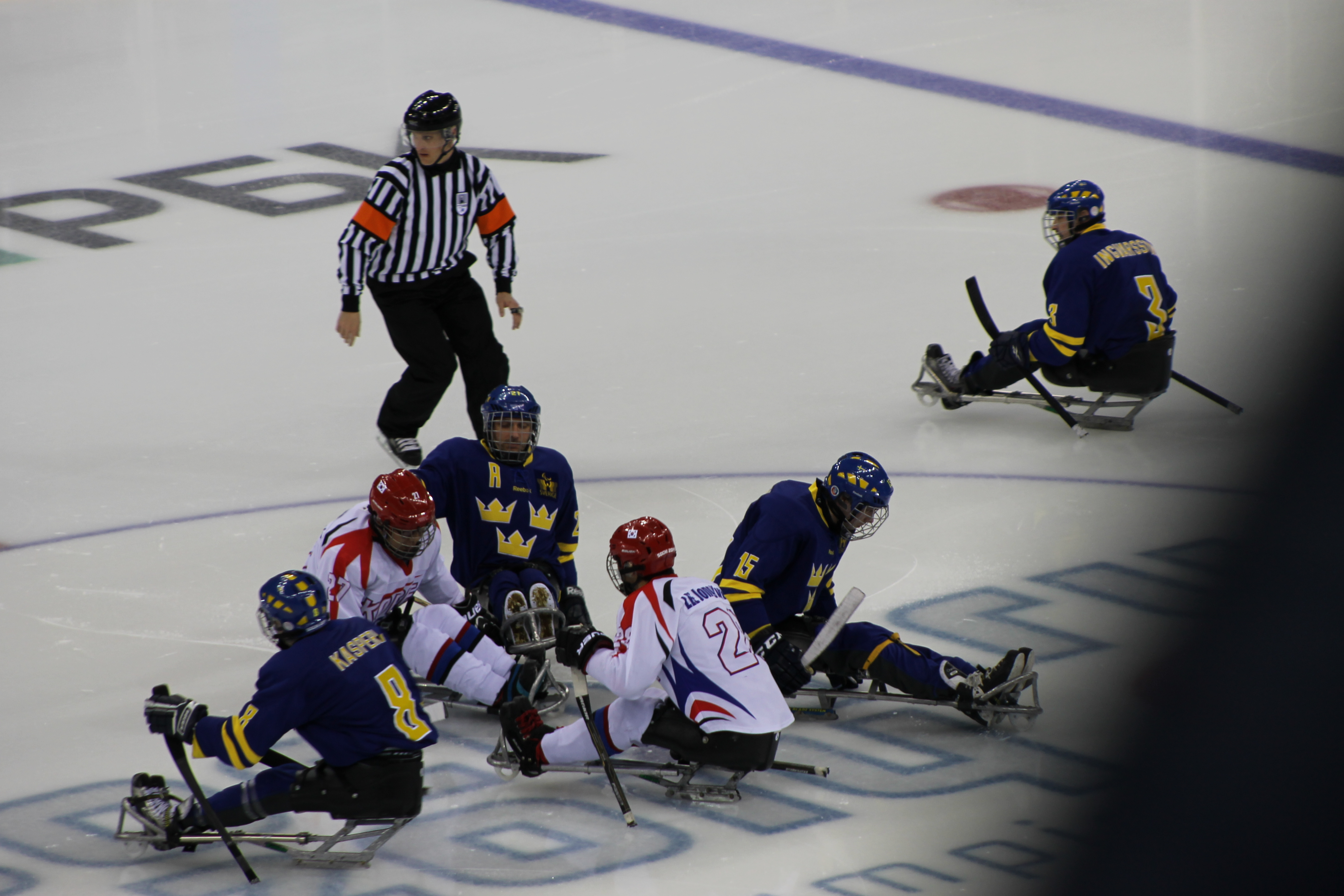
Sweden vs South Korea

Team: Ulf Nilsson, Kenth Jonsson, Niklas Ingvarsson, Rasmus Lundgren, Marcus Holm, Christian Hedberg, Per Kasperi, Peter Ojala, Niklas Rakos, Stefan Olsson, Gunnar From

Pos	Team	Pld	W	OTW	OTL	L	GF	GA	GD	Pts	Qualification
1	Canada	3	3	0	0	0	15	1	+14	9	Semifinals
2	Norway	3	1	1	0	1	4	5	−1	5	Semifinals
3	Czech Republic	3	0	1	1	1	3	4	−1	3	5–8th place semifinals
4	Sweden	3	0	0	1	2	2	14	−12	1	5–8th place semifinals

Source: Sochi 2014

8 March 2014; 13:00	Canada	10–1 (4–0, 3–0, 3–1)	Sweden	Shayba Arena; Attendance: 1,707

Game reference

Benoit St-Amand
Goalies
Ulf Nilsson
Kenth Jonsson
Referee:
(Norway) Petter Hegle
Linesmen:
(Poland) Tomasz Heltman
(Russia) Sergey Yudakov

Bridges (Whitson) – 01:03	1–0
Delaney (Gale, Murray) – 06:42	2–0
Gale (McGregor) – 12:30	3–0
Larocque (Dixon, Rempel) – 13:03	4–0
Dixon (Westlake, Dorion) – 26:47	5–0
Murray (Gale) – 27:40	6–0
Westlake (Dixon, Rempel) (PP) – 29:45	7–0
	7–1	35:22 – Kasperi (Rakos, Ingvarsson)
Dixon (Rempel, Bowden) (PP) – 40:12	8–1
Larocque (Rempel, Arsenault) – 40:32	9–1
Gale (Whitson, McGregor) – 41:30	10–1

2 min
Penalties
10 min
31
Shots
5

9 March 2014; 09:30	Czech Republic	2–1 GWS (0–0, 0–0, 1–1) (OT: 0–0) (SO: 0–1)	Sweden	Shayba Arena; Attendance: 2,285

Game reference
Michal Vápenka	Goalies	Ulf Nilsson	Referee: (Russia) Igor Samoylov; Linesmen: (Canada) Matthew Clark (Russia) Dmitriy Klochkov
Palát – 36:12 / 1–0; / 1–1 / 40:39 – Holm (Kasperi)			Referee: (Russia) Igor Samoylov; Linesmen: (Canada) Matthew Clark (Russia) Dmitriy Klochkov
Palát (miss); Geier (miss); Krupička	Shootout	(miss) Lundgren; (miss) Kasperi; (miss) Ingvarsson	Referee: (Russia) Igor Samoylov; Linesmen: (Canada) Matthew Clark (Russia) Dmitriy Klochkov
4 min	Penalties	4 min	Referee: (Russia) Igor Samoylov; Linesmen: (Canada) Matthew Clark (Russia) Dmitriy Klochkov
22	Shots	9	Referee: (Russia) Igor Samoylov; Linesmen: (Canada) Matthew Clark (Russia) Dmitriy Klochkov

11 March 2014; 13:00	Norway	2–0 (0–0, 1–0, 1–0)	Sweden	Shayba Arena; Attendance: 4,359

Game reference
Kristian Buen; Kjell Christian Hamar	Goalies	Ulf Nilsson	Referee: (Czech Republic) Jan Vaněk; Linesmen: (South Korea) Chae Young-jin (Canada) Matthew Clark
Bøgle (Solberg) – 20:40 / 1–0; Bakke (Pedersen, Solberg) – 34:35 / 2–0			Referee: (Czech Republic) Jan Vaněk; Linesmen: (South Korea) Chae Young-jin (Canada) Matthew Clark
4 min	Penalties	6 min	Referee: (Czech Republic) Jan Vaněk; Linesmen: (South Korea) Chae Young-jin (Canada) Matthew Clark
11	Shots	7	Referee: (Czech Republic) Jan Vaněk; Linesmen: (South Korea) Chae Young-jin (Canada) Matthew Clark

5–8 Classification Play-offs

12 March 2014; 16:00	Italy	3–2 OT (0–1, 0–1, 2–0) (OT: 1–0)	Sweden	Shayba Arena; Attendance: 4,720

Game reference

Santino Stillitano
Gabriele Araudo
Goalies
Ulf Nilsson
Referee:
(United States) Derek Berkebile
Linesmen:
(Poland) Tomasz Heltman
(Czech Republic) Leon Wesley

	0–1	13:58 – Kasperi (From)
	0–2	29:00 – Kasperi (Ingvarsson, Holm) (PP2)
Rosa (Planker) – 33:00	1–2
Leperdi (Cavaliere, Rosa) (EA) – 42:45	2–2
Cavaliere (Planker) – 50:28	3–2

4 min
Penalties
4 min
34
Shots
11

7th Place Game

14 March 2014; 13:00	South Korea	2–0 (1–0, 1–0, 0–0)	Sweden	Shayba Arena; Attendance: 4,832

Game reference
Yu Man-gyun	Goalies	Ulf Nilsson	Referee: (Czech Republic) Jan Vaněk; Linesmen: (Poland) Tomasz Heltman (Norway) Espen Nyberget
Jang D. (Cho Y., Lee Jo.) (PP) – 10:06 / 1–0; Jung (Cho Y.) – 18:16 / 2–0			Referee: (Czech Republic) Jan Vaněk; Linesmen: (Poland) Tomasz Heltman (Norway) Espen Nyberget
4 min	Penalties	6 min	Referee: (Czech Republic) Jan Vaněk; Linesmen: (Poland) Tomasz Heltman (Norway) Espen Nyberget
28	Shots	6	Referee: (Czech Republic) Jan Vaněk; Linesmen: (Poland) Tomasz Heltman (Norway) Espen Nyberget

== Wheelchair curling ==
Team: Jalle Jungnell, Glenn Ikonen, Patrik Kallin, Kristina Ullander, Zandra Reppe

Round Robin

Final round robin standings
Team	Skip	Pld	W	L	PF	PA	Qualification
Russia	Andrei Smirnov	9	8	1	60	38	Playoffs
Canada	Jim Armstrong	9	7	2	66	42	Playoffs
China	Wang Haitao	9	5	4	54	45	Playoffs
Great Britain	Aileen Neilson	9	5	4	53	56	Playoffs
United States	Patrick McDonald	9	4	5	56	52	
Slovakia	Radoslav Ďuriš	9	4	5	47	68	
Sweden	Jalle Jungnell	9	4	5	59	49	
Norway	Rune Lorentsen	9	3	6	47	62	
South Korea	Kim Myung-jin	9	3	6	41	74	
Finland	Markku Karjalainen	9	2	7	61	58	

Draw 1

Sheet A	1	2	3	4	5	6	7	8	Final
Sweden (Jungnell)	0	3	1	0	1	1	1	0	7
Finland (Karjalainen) 🔨	3	0	0	2	0	0	0	1	6

Draw 2

Sheet B	1	2	3	4	5	6	7	8	Final
Sweden (Jungnell)	0	0	1	0	3	0	0	0	4
Great Britain (Neilson) 🔨	1	0	0	1	0	2	1	1	6

Draw 3

Sheet A	1	2	3	4	5	6	7	8	Final
Canada (Armstrong)	1	0	1	1	2	0	1	1	7
Sweden (Jungnell) 🔨	0	2	0	0	0	2	0	0	4

Draw 4

Sheet D	1	2	3	4	5	6	7	8	Final
China (Wang)	2	2	0	3	1	0	0	X	8
Sweden (Jungnell) 🔨	0	0	1	0	0	2	1	X	4

Draw 5

Sheet B	1	2	3	4	5	6	7	8	Final
Russia (Smirnov) 🔨	0	1	2	0	0	4	0	X	7
Sweden (Jungnell)	1	0	0	1	1	0	1	X	4

Draw 6

Sheet C	1	2	3	4	5	6	7	8	Final
Sweden (Jungnell)	2	2	0	0	1	0	4	X	9
Slovakia (Ďuriš) 🔨	0	0	1	1	0	1	0	X	3

Draw 7

Sheet A	1	2	3	4	5	6	7	8	Final
Sweden (Jungnell)	0	2	0	0	0	1	0	X	3
United States (McDonald) 🔨	1	0	1	3	2	0	1	X	8

Draw 8

Sheet D	1	2	3	4	5	6	7	8	Final
Sweden (Jungnell)	2	1	1	2	3	0	2	X	11
Norway (Lorentsen) 🔨	0	0	0	0	0	1	0	X	1

Draw 9

Sheet C	1	2	3	4	5	6	7	8	Final
South Korea (Kim)	0	1	0	0	0	2	0	X	3
Sweden (Jungnell) 🔨	3	0	5	1	2	0	2	X	13

== See also ==
- Sweden at the 2014 Winter Olympics
