= United States at the 2014 Winter Paralympics =

- Flag of the United States
- IPC code: USA
- NPC: United States Paralympic Committee
- Website: www.teamusa.org/US-Paralympics

in Sochi
- Competitors: 74 in 5 sports
- Flag bearers: Jonathan Lujan (opening); Steve Cash (closing)
- Medals Ranked 8th: Gold 2 Silver 7 Bronze 9 Total 18

Winter Paralympics appearances (overview)
- 1976; 1980; 1984; 1988; 1992; 1994; 1998; 2002; 2006; 2010; 2014; 2018; 2022; 2026

The United States competed at the 2014 Winter Paralympics in Sochi, Russia, held between 7–16 March 2014. The team consists of 80 athletes (58 on foot and 22 on wheelchairs), including 6 guides for visually impaired athletes, competing in all five sports.

== Alpine skiing ==
Men

Athlete	Event	Total	
Athlete	Event	Time	Rank
Jasmin Bambur	Super-G, sitting	1:26.36	7
Jasmin Bambur	Downhill, sitting	DNF	
Jasmin Bambur	Combined, sitting	DNF	
Jasmin Bambur	Slalom, sitting	DNF	
Jasmin Bambur	Giant slalom, sitting	2:50.99	17
Mark Bathum; Guide: Cade Yamamoto	Super-G, visually impaired	1:20.71	2nd place, silver medalist(s)
Mark Bathum; Guide: Cade Yamamoto	Downhill, visually impaired	1:23.81	5
Mark Bathum; Guide: Cade Yamamoto	Combined, visually impaired	2:17.38	2nd place, silver medalist(s)
Mark Bathum; Guide: Cade Yamamoto	Slalom, visually impaired	1:49.13	4
Mark Bathum; Guide: Cade Yamamoto	Giant slalom, visually impaired	DNF	
Heath Calhoun	Super-G, sitting	1:24.65	4
Heath Calhoun	Combined, sitting	2:19.09	2nd place, silver medalist(s)
Heath Calhoun	Slalom, sitting	DNF	
Heath Calhoun	Giant slalom, sitting	2:35.03	6
Tyler Carter	Giant slalom, standing	3:00.14	27
Chris Devlin-Young	Downhill, sitting	1:27.84	10
Chris Devlin-Young	Super-G, sitting	DNF	
Chris Devlin-Young	Giant slalom, sitting	DNF	
Ralph Green	Super-G, standing	DNF	
Ralph Green	Slalom, standing	1:57.20	17
Ralph Green	Giant slalom, standing	2:44.87	16
Gerald Hayden	Slalom, sitting	2:00.16	8
Joel Hunt	Giant slalom, standing	2:58.33	24
Ian Jansing	Slalom, standing	2:10.75	28
Jon Lujan	Super-G, standing	DNF	
Jon Lujan	Slalom, standing	DNF	
Jon Lujan	Giant slalom, standing	DNF	
Stephen Lawler	Giant slalom, sitting	DNS	
Scott Meyer	Slalom, sitting	DNF	
Scott Meyer	Giant slalom, sitting	DNF	
Pat Parnell	Slalom, standing	DNF	
Jamie Stanton	Super-G, standing	1:24.66	6
Jamie Stanton	Combined, sitting	2:22.65	13
Jamie Stanton	Slalom, standing	2:02.57	22
Jamie Stanton	Giant slalom, standing	DNF	
Tyler Walker	Downhill, sitting	DNF	

Women

Athlete	Event	Total	
Athlete	Event	Time	Rank
Lindsay Ball; Guide: Diane Barras	Giant slalom, visually impaired	DNF	
Stephanie Jallen	Super-G, standing	1:30.14	3rd place, bronze medalist(s)
Stephanie Jallen	Combined, standing	2:23.13	3rd place, bronze medalist(s)
Stephanie Jallen	Slalom, standing	DNF	
Stephanie Jallen	Giant slalom, standing	DNF	
Allison Jones	Downhill, standing	1:34.09	3rd place, bronze medalist(s)
Allison Jones	Super-G, standing	1:30.66	4
Allison Jones	Combined, standing	2:29.50	4
Allison Jones	Slalom, standing	DNF	
Allison Jones	Giant slalom, standing	2:48.57	4
Staci Mannella; Guide: Kim Seevers	Slalom, visually impaired	2:21.05	6
Staci Mannella; Guide: Kim Seevers	Giant slalom, visually impaired	3:10.77	6
Alana Nichols	Downhill, sitting	1:35.69	2nd place, silver medalist(s)
Alana Nichols	Super-G, sitting	DNF	
Alana Nichols	Giant slalom, sitting	3:00.24	4
Melanie Schwartz	Super-G, standing	1:40.27	9
Melanie Schwartz	Combined, standing	DNF	
Melanie Schwartz	Slalom, standing	2:31.08	10
Melanie Schwartz	Giant slalom, standing	3:13.06	14
Laurie Stephens	Downhill, sitting	1:36.94	3rd place, bronze medalist(s)
Laurie Stephens	Super-G, sitting	1:32.09	3rd place, bronze medalist(s)
Laurie Stephens	Combined, sitting	DNS	
Laurie Stephens	Slalom, sitting	2:18.45	4
Laurie Stephens	Giant slalom, sitting	3:04.90	6
Danelle Umstead; Guide: Rob Umstead	Downhill, visually impaired	1:36.70	5
Danelle Umstead; Guide: Rob Umstead	Super-G, visually impaired	1:32.04	4
Danelle Umstead; Guide: Rob Umstead	Combined, visually impaired	2:42.09	3rd place, bronze medalist(s)
Danelle Umstead; Guide: Rob Umstead	Slalom, visually impaired	2:16.21	4
Stephani Victor	Super-G, sitting	DNF	

=== Snowboarding ===
Men

Athlete	Event	Race 1		Race 2		Race 3		Total	
Athlete	Event	Time	Rank	Time	Rank	Time	Rank	Time	Rank
Tyler Burdick	Snowboard cross	57.03	7	56.73	7	55.76	5	1:52.49	8
Keith Gabel	Snowboard cross	54.02	3	53.61	3	53.49	3	1:47.10	3rd place, bronze medalist(s)
Dan Monzo	Snowboard cross	1:04.67	16	1:14.57	22	1:02.85	16	2:07.52	18
Mike Shea	Snowboard cross	52.29	1	51.89	2	1:00.27	9	1:44.18	2nd place, silver medalist(s)
Evan Strong	Snowboard cross	52.55	2	51.62	1	51.99	1	1:43.61	1st place, gold medalist(s)

Women

Athlete	Event	Race 1		Race 2		Race 3		Total	
Athlete	Event	Time	Rank	Time	Rank	Time	Rank	Time	Rank
Cristina Albert	Snowboard cross	1:10.55	4	1:30.75	4	1:24.71	5	2:35.26	4
Heidi Jo Duce	Snowboard cross	1:17.40	6	DSQ		1:20.03	4	2:37.43	5
Megan Harmon	Snowboard cross	1:40.07	10	1:55.84	9	1:51.02	10	3:31.09	10
Amy Purdy	Snowboard cross	1:08.61	3	1:06.88	3	1:07.41	3	2:14.29	3rd place, bronze medalist(s)
Nicole Roundy	Snowboard cross	1:24.10	8	1:59.54	10	1:35.47	7	2:59.57	8

== Biathlon ==
Visually impaired

Athlete	Events	Class	Factor %	Real time	Missed shots	Result	Rank
Jacob Adicoff; Guide: Reid Pletcher	Men's 7.5 kilometres	B3	100%	25:35.6	5+2	25:35.6	14
Kevin Burton; Guide: Gregory Rawlings	Men's 7.5 kilometres	B2	98%	27:01.1	2+2	26:28.7	16
Kevin Burton; Guide: David Chamberlain	Men's 15 kilometres	B2	98%	43:09.8	2+1+1+2	48:18.0	12

Sitting

Athlete	Events	Class	Factor %	Real time	Missed shots	Result	Rank
Daniel Cnossen	Men's 7.5 kilometres	LW12	100%	24:13.8	3+0	24:13.8	14
Daniel Cnossen	Men's 12.5 kilometres	LW12	100%	39:01.0	1+0+1+1	39:01.0	11
Daniel Cnossen	Men's 15 kilometres	LW12	100%	46:27.8	1+1+0+0	48:27.8	10
Travis Dodson	Men's 7.5 kilometres	LW12	100%	27:35.2	0+5	27:35.2	20
Travis Dodson	Men's 15 kilometres	LW12	100%	50:40.5	2+0+1+2	55:40.5	21
Sean Halsted	Men's 7.5 kilometres	LW11.5	97%	DSQ			
Sean Halsted	Men's 12.5 kilometres	LW11.5	97%	40:46.1	0+0+2+1	39:32.7	12
Sean Halsted	Men's 15 kilometres	LW11.5	97%	47:57.4	1+0+1+0	48:31.1	11
Augusto Jose Perez	Men's 12.5 kilometres			48:40.9	1+0+2+4	48:40.9	19
Aaron Pike	Men's 7.5 kilometres	LW11.5	97%	26:46.6	2+2	25:58.4	19
Aaron Pike	Men's 15 kilometres	LW11.5	97%	48:29.0	1+2+2+3	55:01.7	19
Andy Soule	Men's 7.5 kilometres	LW12	100%	21:48.5	0+0	21:48.5	4
Andy Soule	Men's 12.5 kilometres	LW12	100%	37:04.7	0+0+0+0	37:04.7	5
Andy Soule	Men's 15 kilometres	LW12	100%	44:52.6	0+0+0+0	44:52.6	4
Jeremy Wagner	Men's 7.5 kilometres	LW11.5	97%	26:16.1	0+1	25:28.8	18
Jeremy Wagner	Men's 12.5 kilometres	LW11.5	97%	42:06.9	0+0+1+0	40:51.1	16
Jeremy Wagner	Men's 15 kilometres	LW11.5	97%	50:55.1	1+0+1+1	52:23.4	18
Oksana Masters	Women's 6 kilometres	LW12	100%	19:43.2	0+0	19:43.2	4
Oksana Masters	Women's 10 kilometres	LW12	100%	40:22.8	2+2+3+2	40:22.8	8

Standing

Athlete	Events	Class	Factor %	Real time	Missed shots	Result	Rank
Omar Bermejo	Men's 7.5 kilometres	LW6	96%	25:23.8	1+0	24:22.8	18
Omar Bermejo	Men's 12.5 kilometres	LW6	96%	38:56.3	0+1+1+0	37:22.8	17
Omar Bermejo	Men's 15 kilometres	LW6	96%	48:17.7	1+2+0+0	49:21.8	17

== Cross-country skiing ==
Visually impaired

Athlete	Events	Class	Factor %	Qualification		Semifinal		Final	
Athlete	Events	Class	Factor %	Result	Rank	Result	Rank	Result	Rank
Jacob Adicoff; Guide: Reid Pletcher	Men's 1 km sprint	B3	100%	3:49.96	8	4:29.4	4	did not advance	
Jacob Adicoff; Guide: Reid Pletcher	Men's 10 km	B3	100%	—N/a				25:43.0	7
Jacob Adicoff; Guide: Reid Pletcher	Men's 20 km	B3	100%	—N/a				58:37.4	6
Kevin Burton; Guide: David Chamberlain	Men's 1 km sprint	B2	98%	4:39.73	14	did not advance			
Kevin Burton; Guide: David Chamberlain	Men's 10 km	B2	98%	—N/a				28:25.8	15
Kevin Burton; Guide: David Chamberlain	Men's 20 km	B2	98%	—N/a				1:07:18.6	10

Sitting

Athlete	Events	Class	Factor %	Qualification		Semifinal		Final	
Athlete	Events	Class	Factor %	Result	Rank	Result	Rank	Result	Rank
Daniel Cnossen	Men's 1 km sprint	LW12	100%	2:18.01	9 Q	2:23.4	3 Q	2:39.9	6
Daniel Cnossen	Men's 10 km	LW12	100%	—N/a				33:02.0	10
Daniel Cnossen	Men's 15 km	LW12	100%	—N/a				45:22.4	13
Travis Dodson	Men's 1 km sprint	LW12	100%	2:27.55	19	did not advance			
Travis Dodson	Men's 10 km	LW12	100%	—N/a				35:49.6	23
Sean Halsted	Men's 1 km sprint	LW11.5	97%	2:25.57	17	did not advance			
Sean Halsted	Men's 10 km	LW11.5	97%	—N/a				34:21.9	16
Sean Halsted	Men's 15 km	LW11.5	97%	—N/a				44:57.9	9
Augusto Perez	Men's 15 km			—N/a				51:24.2	17
Aaron Pike	Men's 1 km sprint	LW11.5	97%	2:20.86	14	did not advance			
Aaron Pike	Men's 10 km	LW11.5	97%	—N/a				34:00.0	14
Aaron Pike	Men's 15 km	LW11.5	97%	—N/a				45:20.6	12
Brian Price	Men's 15 km	LW11.5	97%	—N/a				52:19.5	19
Andy Soule	Men's 1 km sprint	LW12	100%	2:19.31	11 Q	2:34.0	3 Q	2:38.0	5
Andy Soule	Men's 10 km	LW12	100%	—N/a				32:56.1	9
Andy Soule	Men's 15 km	LW12	100%	—N/a				42:53.8	5
Jeremy Wagner	Men's 1 km sprint	LW11.5	97%	2:22.35	15	did not advance			
Jeremy Wagner	Men's 10 km	LW11.5	97%	—N/a				35:40.5	22
Monica Bascio	Women's 1 km sprint	LW11	94%	2:56.81	18	did not advance			
Monica Bascio	Women's 5 km	LW11	94%	—N/a				18:50.4	16
Monica Bascio	Women's 12 km	LW11	94%	—N/a				41:56.2	7
Oksana Masters	Women's 1 km sprint	LW12	100%	2:34.81	3	2:52.3	2	2:47.6	4
Oksana Masters	Women's 5 km	LW12	100%	—N/a				17:04.8	3rd place, bronze medalist(s)
Oksana Masters	Women's 12 km	LW12	100%	—N/a				39:16.0	2nd place, silver medalist(s)
Tatyana McFadden	Women's 1 km sprint		94%	2:35.22	4	2:57.9	2	2:45.7	2nd place, silver medalist(s)
Tatyana McFadden	Women's 5 km		94%	—N/a				17:27.8	7
Tatyana McFadden	Women's 12 km		94%	—N/a				40:38.2	5
Beth Requist	Women's 1 km sprint		94%	3:09.79	19	did not advance			
Beth Requist	Women's 5 km		94%	—N/a				20:17.4	19
Beth Requist	Women's 12 km		94%	—N/a				46:29.1	16
Jacob Adicoff; Guide: Reid Pletcher; Tatyana McFadden	Mixed relay			—N/a				29:06.7	6
Omar Bermejo; Kevin Burton; Guide: David Chamberlain; Augusto Perez; Brian Price	Open relay			—N/a				29:58.3	9

Standing

Athlete	Events	Class	Factor %	Qualification		Semifinal		Final	
Athlete	Events	Class	Factor %	Result	Rank	Result	Rank	Result	Rank
Omar Bermejo	Men's 1 km sprint	LW6	96%	4:48.86	30	did not advance			
Omar Bermejo	Men's 10 km	LW6	96%	—N/a				29:51.8	29
John Oman	Men's 1 km sprint		97%	4:57.99	31	did not advance			
John Oman	Men's 10 km		97%	—N/a				31:01.8	32
John Oman	Men's 20 km		97%	—N/a				1:17:04.1	18

== Ice sledge hockey ==
Preliminary round

Pos	Team	Pld	W	OTW	OTL	L	GF	GA	GD	Pts	Qualification
1	Russia (H)	3	2	0	1	0	11	4	+7	7	Semifinals
2	United States	3	2	0	0	1	9	3	+6	6	Semifinals
3	Italy	3	1	0	0	2	3	13	−10	3	5–8th place semifinals
4	South Korea	3	0	1	0	2	4	7	−3	2	5–8th place semifinals

Source: Sochi 2014
(H) Host

8 March 2014; 16:30	United States	5–1 (1–0, 1–0, 3–1)	Italy	Shayba Arena; Attendance: 3,617

Game reference

Steve Cash
Jen Lee
Goalies
Santino Stillitano
Referee:
(Canada) Paul Boese
Linesmen:
(Canada) Matthew Clark
(Russia) Dmitriy Klochkov

Farmer (Landeros, Chace) (PP) – 13:45	1–0
Roybal (Farmer) – 26:12	2–0
Sweeney – 33:04	3–0
Roybal (Pauls, Landeros) – 40:18	4–0
	4–1	43:34 – Planker (Cavaliere)
Schaus (Landeros) – 44:55	5–1

8 min
Penalties
10 min
19
Shots
12

9 March 2014; 16:30	United States	3–0 (2–0, 1–0, 0–0)	South Korea	Shayba Arena; Attendance: 5,305

Game reference

Steve Cash
Goalies
Yu Man-gyun
Referee:
(Czech Republic) Jan Vaněk
Linesmen:
(Czech Republic) Leon Wesley
(Russia) Sergey Yudakov

Chace – 00:57	1–0
Page (McCoy) – 11:51	2–0
Page (McCoy, Cash) – 29:29	3–0

6 min
Penalties
4 min
18
Shots
9

11 March 2014; 16:30	United States	1–2 (0–1, 0–1, 1–0)	Russia	Shayba Arena; Attendance: 5,765

Game reference

Steve Cash
Goalies
Vladimir Kamantsev
Referee:
(Norway) Petter Hegle
Linesmen:
(Netherlands) Louis Beelen
(Czech Republic) Leon Wesley

	0–1	11:57 – Volkov (Kuznetsov, Lisov) (PP2)
	0–2	17:37 – Shikhov (Varlakov)
Page (Landeros, Yohe) – 34:50	1–2

6 min
Penalties
6 min
23
Shots
10

Semifinal

13 March 2014; 20:00	Canada	0–3 (0–2, 0–1, 0–0)	United States	Shayba Arena; Attendance: 5,150

Game reference

Corbin Watson
Goalies
Steve Cash
Referee:
(Canada) Paul Boese
Linesmen:
(Russia) Dmitriy Klochkov
(Russia) Sergey Yudakov

0–1	09:12 – Farmer (Pauls, Landeros)
0–2	14:04 – Farmer (Chace)
0–3	19:55 – Pauls (Farmer)

4 min
Penalties
6 min
11
Shots
10

Gold Medal Game

15 March 2014; 20:00	United States	1–0 (0–0, 1–0, 0–0)	Russia	Shayba Arena; Attendance: 6,825

Game reference
Steve Cash	Goalies	Vladimir Kamantsev	Referee: (Canada) Paul Boese; Linesmen: (Canada) Matthew Clark (Czech Republic) Leon Wesley
Sweeney – 24:28 / 1–0			Referee: (Canada) Paul Boese; Linesmen: (Canada) Matthew Clark (Czech Republic) Leon Wesley
4 min	Penalties	2 min	Referee: (Canada) Paul Boese; Linesmen: (Canada) Matthew Clark (Czech Republic) Leon Wesley
4	Shots	6	Referee: (Canada) Paul Boese; Linesmen: (Canada) Matthew Clark (Czech Republic) Leon Wesley

(gold); United States	Tyler Carron; Steve Cash; Taylor Chace; Declan Farmer; Nikko Landeros; Jen Lee; Taylor Lipsett; Dan McCoy; Kevin McKee; Adam Page; Josh Pauls; Rico Roman; Brody Roybal; Paul Schaus; Greg Shaw; Joshua Sweeney; Andy Yohe

== Wheelchair curling ==
The United States qualified a mixed wheelchair curling team as one of the nine highest-ranked nations based on results from the last three World Wheelchair Curling Championships.

Team

Position	Curler
Skip	Patrick McDonald
Third	David Palmer
Second	Jimmy Joseph
Lead	Penny Greely
Alternate	Meghan Lino

Standings

Final round robin standings
Team	Skip	Pld	W	L	PF	PA	Qualification
Russia	Andrei Smirnov	9	8	1	60	38	Playoffs
Canada	Jim Armstrong	9	7	2	66	42	Playoffs
China	Wang Haitao	9	5	4	54	45	Playoffs
Great Britain	Aileen Neilson	9	5	4	53	56	Playoffs
United States	Patrick McDonald	9	4	5	56	52	
Slovakia	Radoslav Ďuriš	9	4	5	47	68	
Sweden	Jalle Jungnell	9	4	5	59	49	
Norway	Rune Lorentsen	9	3	6	47	62	
South Korea	Kim Myung-jin	9	3	6	41	74	
Finland	Markku Karjalainen	9	2	7	61	58	

Results

Draw 1

Saturday, March 8, 9:30

Sheet D	1	2	3	4	5	6	7	8	Final
Slovakia (Ďuriš)	2	1	0	0	1	1	0	1	6
United States (McDonald) 🔨	0	0	1	1	0	0	2	0	4

Draw 2

Saturday, March 8, 15:30

Sheet C	1	2	3	4	5	6	7	8	Final
United States (McDonald) 🔨	0	1	0	3	0	1	0	X	5
South Korea (Kim)	3	0	3	0	2	0	1	X	9

Draw 3

Sunday, March 9, 9:30

Sheet A	1	2	3	4	5	6	7	8	Final
United States (McDonald) 🔨	2	0	2	0	3	0	0	1	8
Norway (Lorentsen)	0	1	0	2	0	1	1	0	5

Draw 5

Monday, March 10, 9:30

Sheet B	1	2	3	4	5	6	7	8	Final
United States (McDonald) 🔨	0	1	0	1	0	0	0	X	2
Canada (Armstrong)	1	0	2	0	2	1	1	X	7

Draw 6

Monday, March 10, 15:30

Sheet C	1	2	3	4	5	6	7	8	Final
Russia (Smirnov)	2	1	0	2	0	1	0	0	6
United States (McDonald) 🔨	0	0	1	0	1	0	1	2	5

Draw 8

Tuesday, March 11, 15:30

Sheet D	1	2	3	4	5	6	7	8	Final
United States (McDonald)	1	0	1	3	0	1	1	0	7
Finland (Karjalainen) 🔨	0	1	0	0	4	0	0	1	6

Draw 9

Wednesday, March 12, 9:30

Sheet C	1	2	3	4	5	6	7	8	Final
United States (McDonald) 🔨	1	1	1	1	0	2	4	X	10
China (Wang)	0	0	0	0	2	0	0	X	2

Draw 10

Wednesday, March 12, 15:30

Sheet A	1	2	3	4	5	6	7	8	Final
Sweden (Jungnell)	0	2	0	0	0	1	0	X	3
United States (McDonald) 🔨	1	0	1	3	2	0	1	X	8

Draw 11

Thursday, March 13, 9:30

Sheet B	1	2	3	4	5	6	7	8	EE	Final
Great Britain (Neilson)	0	0	1	0	1	0	5	0	1	8
United States (McDonald) 🔨	2	1	0	2	0	1	0	1	0	7

== See also ==
- United States at the Paralympics
- United States at the 2014 Winter Olympics
