= Canada at the 2014 Winter Paralympics =

- Flag of Canada
- IPC code: CAN
- NPC: Canadian Paralympic Committee
- Website: www.paralympic.ca

in Sochi
- Competitors: 54 in 5 sports
- Flag bearers: Sonja Gaudet (opening ceremony); Josh Dueck (closing ceremony)
- Medals Ranked 3rd: Gold 7 Silver 2 Bronze 7 Total 16

Winter Paralympics appearances (overview)
- 1976; 1980; 1984; 1988; 1992; 1994; 1998; 2002; 2006; 2010; 2014; 2018; 2022; 2026

Canada competed at the 2014 Winter Paralympics in Sochi, Russia, from March 7 to 16, 2014.

Canada sent a team of 54 athletes to compete in all five sports, and finished with 7 gold medals and 16 overall (ranking 3rd and 4th respectively). This met the performance goal set by the Canadian Paralympic Committee on a top three finish in total gold medals.

== Medallists ==
Medals by sport
Sport	1st place, gold medalist(s)	2nd place, silver medalist(s)	3rd place, bronze medalist(s)	Total
Alpine skiing	2	1	5	8
Biathlon	0	1	1	2
Cross-country skiing	4	0	0	4
Ice sledge hockey	0	0	1	1
Wheelchair curling	1	0	0	1
Total	7	2	7	16

Medal	Name	Sport	Event	Date
Gold	Brian McKeever; Guide: Erik Carleton	Cross-country skiing	Men's 20 km, visually impaired	March 10
Gold	Brian McKeever; Guide: Graham Nishikawa	Cross-country skiing	Men's 1 km sprint classic, visually impaired	March 12
Gold	Josh Dueck	Alpine skiing	Men's combined, sitting	March 14
Gold	Mac Marcoux; Guide: Robin Femy	Alpine skiing	Men's giant slalom, visually impaired	March 15
Gold	Jim Armstrong; Ina Forrest; Sonja Gaudet; Mark Ideson; Dennis Thiessen	Wheelchair curling	Mixed	March 15
Gold	Christopher Klebl	Cross-country skiing	Men's 10 km, sitting	March 16
Gold	Brian McKeever; Guide: Erik Carleton	Cross-country skiing	Men's 10 km, visually impaired	March 16
Silver	Josh Dueck	Alpine skiing	Men's downhill, sitting	March 8
Silver	Mark Arendz	Biathlon	Men's 7.5 km, standing	March 8
Bronze	Mac Marcoux; Guide: Robin Femy	Alpine skiing	Men's downhill, visually impaired	March 8
Bronze	Caleb Brousseau	Alpine skiing	Men's super-G, sitting	March 9
Bronze	Mac Marcoux; Guide: Robin Femy	Alpine skiing	Men's super-G, visually impaired	March 9
Bronze	Mark Arendz	Biathlon	Men's 12.5 km, standing	March 11
Bronze	Kimberly Joines	Alpine skiing	Women's slalom, sitting	March 12
Bronze	Chris Williamson; Guide: Nick Brush	Alpine skiing	Men's slalom, visually impaired	March 13
Bronze	Canada national ice sledge hockey team: Steve Arsenault; Bradley Bowden; Billy Bridges; Ben Delaney; Adam Dixon; Marc Dorion; Anthony Gale; James Gemmell; Dominic Larocque; Karl Ludwig; Tyler McGregor; Graeme Murray; Kevin Rempel; Benoit St-Amand; Corbin Watson; Greg Westlake; Derek Whitson	Ice sledge hockey	Mixed	March 15

== Alpine skiing ==
Men

Athlete	Event	Run 1			Run 2			Final/Total		
Athlete	Event	Time	Diff	Rank	Time	Diff	Rank	Time	Diff	Rank
Caleb Brousseau	Downhill, sitting	—N/a						1:25.62	+1.82	6
Caleb Brousseau	Super-G, sitting	—N/a						1:22.05	+2.54	3rd place, bronze medalist(s)
Caleb Brousseau	Combined, sitting	did not finish			did not advance					
Caleb Brousseau	Slalom, sitting	did not finish			did not advance					
Caleb Brousseau	Giant slalom, sitting	did not finish			did not advance					
Josh Dueck	Downhill, sitting	—N/a						1:24.19	+0.39	2nd place, silver medalist(s)
Josh Dueck	Super-G, sitting	—N/a						did not finish		
Josh Dueck	Combined, sitting	59.93	+1.22	5	1:18.27	0.00	1	2:18.20	0.00	1st place, gold medalist(s)
Josh Dueck	Slalom, sitting	did not finish			did not advance					
Josh Dueck	Giant slalom, sitting	did not finish			did not advance					
Matthew Hallat	Super-G, standing	—N/a						did not finish		
Matthew Hallat	Combined, standing	did not finish			did not advance					
Matthew Hallat	Slalom, standing	49.53	+1.84	5	54.28	+3.00	7	1:43.81	+4.84	6
Braydon Luscombe	Downhill, standing	—N/a						did not finish		
Braydon Luscombe	Super-G, standing	—N/a						did not finish		
Braydon Luscombe	Combined, standing	52.17	+1.87	2	did not finish					
Braydon Luscombe	Slalom, standing	49.94	+2.25	6	did not finish					
Mac Marcoux; Guide: Robin Femy	Downhill, visually impaired	—N/a						1:23.02	+1.26	3rd place, bronze medalist(s)
Mac Marcoux; Guide: Robin Femy	Super-G, visually impaired	—N/a						1:20.77	+0.19	3rd place, bronze medalist(s)
Mac Marcoux; Guide: Robin Femy	Combined, visually impaired	did not finish			did not advance					
Mac Marcoux; Guide: Robin Femy	Slalom, visually impaired	52.03	+2.34	5	did not finish					
Mac Marcoux; Guide: Robin Femy	Giant slalom, visually impaired	1:16.02	0.00	1	1:13.60	+0.35	2	2:29.62	0.00	1st place, gold medalist(s)
Kurt Oatway	Downhill, sitting	—N/a						1:25.46	+1.66	5
Kurt Oatway	Super-G, sitting	—N/a						1:29.10	+9.59	9
Kurt Oatway	Combined, sitting	did not finish			did not advance					
Kurt Oatway	Slalom, sitting	57.61	+4.87	12	did not finish					
Kurt Oatway	Giant slalom, sitting	did not finish			did not advance					
Kirk Schornstein	Downhill, standing	—N/a						did not finish		
Kirk Schornstein	Super-G, standing	—N/a						1:27.83	+6.91	13
Kirk Schornstein	Combined, standing	57.62	+7.32	17	1:24.45	+6.06	11	2:22.07	+12.35	12
Kirk Schornstein	Slalom, standing	54.28	+6.59	17	59.77	+8.49	16	1:54.05	+15.08	16
Kirk Schornstein	Giant slalom, standing	1:22.51	+7.79	14	1:18.46	+7.31	14	2:40.97	+15.10	13
Chris Williamson; Guide: Nick Brush	Slalom, visually impaired	50.18	+0.49	2	58.43	+4.91	6	1:48.61	+5.40	3rd place, bronze medalist(s)
Chris Williamson; Guide: Nick Brush	Giant slalom, visually impaired	1:21.29	+5.27	5	1:16.28	+3.03	5	2:37.57	+7.95	5

Women

Athlete	Event	Run 1			Run 2			Final/Total		
Athlete	Event	Time	Diff	Rank	Time	Diff	Rank	Time	Diff	Rank
Kimberly Joines	Slalom, sitting	1:07.33	+0.92	2	1:07.83	0.00	1	2:15.16	+0.81	3rd place, bronze medalist(s)
Kimberly Joines	Giant slalom, sitting	1:30.44	0.00	1	did not finish					
Erin Latimer	Super-G, standing	—N/a						did not finish		
Erin Latimer	Combined, standing	1:07.18	+13.70	8	1:34.67	+9.76	6	2:41.85	+23.46	7
Erin Latimer	Slalom, standing	1:09.40	+10.03	8	1:09.91	+9.43	7	2:19.31	+19.46	8
Erin Latimer	Giant slalom, standing	1:33.42	+8.44	9	1:22.71	+8.85	9	2:56.13	+17.29	9
Alana Ramsay	Super-G, standing	—N/a						1:43.39	+19.19	10
Alana Ramsay	Combined, standing	did not start								
Alana Ramsay	Slalom, standing	1:13.91	+14.54	9	1:10.15	+9.67	8	2:24.06	+24.21	9
Alana Ramsay	Giant slalom, standing	1:42.09	+17.11	16	did not finish					
Alexandra Starker	Super-G, standing	—N/a						1:36.52	+12.32	7
Alexandra Starker	Combined, standing	1:06.59	+13.11	7	did not start					
Alexandra Starker	Slalom, standing	1:07.58	+8.21	7	1:06.58	+6.10	6	2:14.16	+14.31	6
Alexandra Starker	Giant slalom, standing	1:33.91	+8.93	10	1:23.62	+9.76	11	2:57.53	+18.69	10

=== Snowboarding ===
Para-snowboarding made its debut at the Winter Paralympics and it was placed under the Alpine skiing program during the 2014 Games. Canada's para-snowboarding team was announced on January 26, 2014. Michelle Salt was added to the team on February 22, 2014.

Men

Athlete	Event	Race 1		Race 2		Race 3		Total	
Athlete	Event	Time	Rank	Time	Rank	Time	Rank	Time	Rank
John Leslie	Snowboard cross	56.74	6	56.25	6	55.63	4	1:51.88	7
Ian Lockey	Snowboard cross	1:09.81	21	1:08.79	18	1:01.47	13	2:10.26	21
Tyler Mosher	Snowboard cross	1:03.73	14	59.69	11	1:00.11	8	1:59.80	12

Women

Athlete	Event	Race 1		Race 2		Race 3		Total	
Athlete	Event	Time	Rank	Time	Rank	Time	Rank	Time	Rank
Michelle Salt	Snowboard cross	1:34.43	9	1:49.80	7	1:46.85	8	3:21.28	9

== Biathlon ==
Men

Athlete	Events	Final				
Athlete	Events	Real Time	Calculated Time	Missed Shots	Result	Rank
Mark Arendz	7.5km, standing	20:02.5	19:14.4	1+0	19:14.4	2nd place, silver medalist(s)
Mark Arendz	12.5km, standing	31:47.3	30:31.0	0+0+1+0	30:31.0	3rd place, bronze medalist(s)
Mark Arendz	15km, standing	40:10.6	40:34.2	1+0+0+1	40:34.2	11
Brian McKeever; Guide: Erik Carleton	7.5km, visually impaired	did not start				

Women

Athlete	Events	Final				
Athlete	Events	Real Time	Calculated Time	Missed Shots	Result	Rank
Caroline Bisson	6km, standing	28:22.9	27:14.8	2+1	27:14.8	14
Caroline Bisson	10km, standing	41:33.6	39:53.9	2+0+1+0	39:53.9	11
Caroline Bisson	12.5km, standing	54:32.7	56:21.8	1+2+0+1	56:21.8	12
Margarita Gorbounova; Guide: Andrea Bundon	6km, visually impaired	26:17.8	26:17.8	2+0	26:17.8	7

== Cross-country skiing ==
Men

Athlete	Event	Qualification			Semifinal		Final		
Athlete	Event	Real Time	Result	Rank	Result	Rank	Real Time	Result	Rank
Mark Arendz	10km free, standing	—N/a					26:19.6	25:16.4	11
Yves Bourque	1km sprint classic, sitting	2:50.67	2:50.67	24	did not qualify				
Yves Bourque	10km free, sitting	—N/a					39:11.5	39:11.5	24
Yves Bourque	15km, sitting	—N/a					55:25.4	55:25.4	20
Sébastien Fortier	1km sprint classic, sitting	2:48.85	2:43.78	23	did not qualify				
Sébastien Fortier	10km free, sitting	—N/a					41:17.7	41:17.7	26
Sébastien Fortier	15km, sitting	—N/a					53:19.3	51:43.3	18
Louis Fortin	1km sprint classic, standing	4:58.38	4:46.45	29	did not qualify				
Louis Fortin	10km free, standing	—N/a					34:21.2	32:58.8	36
Christopher Klebl	1km sprint classic, sitting	2:24.29	2:15.63	5	2:29.9	5	did not advance		
Christopher Klebl	10km free, sitting	—N/a					32:50.2	30:52.0	1st place, gold medalist(s)
Christopher Klebl	15km, sitting	—N/a					45:52.0	43:06.9	6
Brian McKeever; Guides: Erik Carleton, Graham Nishikawa	1km sprint classic, visually impaired	3:32.51	3:32.51	1	4:09.50	1	3:59.60	3:59.60	1st place, gold medalist(s)
Brian McKeever; Guides: Erik Carleton, Graham Nishikawa	10km free, visually impaired	—N/a					23:18.1	23:18.1	1st place, gold medalist(s)
Brian McKeever; Guides: Erik Carleton, Graham Nishikawa	20km, visually impaired	—N/a					52:37.1	52:37.1	1st place, gold medalist(s)

Women

Athlete	Event	Qualification			Semifinal		Final		
Athlete	Event	Real Time	Result	Rank	Result	Rank	Real Time	Result	Rank
Caroline Bisson	1km sprint classic, standing	did not start							
Caroline Bisson	5km, standing	—N/a					17:37.5	16:55.2	16
Colette Bourgonje	1km sprint classic, sitting	3:22.94	2:54.53	16	did not qualify				
Colette Bourgonje	5km, sitting	—N/a					21:10.9	18:13.0	13
Colette Bourgonje	12km, sitting	—N/a					50:58.5	43:50.3	13
Margarita Gorbounova; Guide: Andrea Bundon	1km sprint classic, visually impaired	5:14.58	5:14.58	7	did not qualify				
Margarita Gorbounova; Guide: Andrea Bundon	5km, visually impaired	—N/a					15:42.2	15:42.2	8
Margarita Gorbounova; Guide: Andrea Bundon	15km, visually impaired	—N/a					1:04:43.9	1:04:43.9	4
Brittany Hudak	1km sprint classic, standing	5:22.81	5:13.13	12	5:13.0	6	did not advance		
Brittany Hudak	5km, standing	—N/a					16:03.9	15:35.0	12
Brittany Hudak	15km, standing	—N/a					1:05:01.8	59:10.6	10
Robbi Weldon; Guides: Phil Wood	1km sprint classic, visually impaired	5:06.03	4:59.91	6	5:10.3	3	did not advance		
Robbi Weldon; Guides: Phil Wood	5km, visually impaired	—N/a					15:42.3	15:23.5	7

Relay

Athletes	Event	Final	
Athletes	Event	Time	Rank
Christopher Klebl; Brian McKeever; Guides: Erik Carleton, Graham Nishikawa	4 x 2.5km open relay	25:51.9	4
Sébastien Fortier; Margarita Gorbounova; Guide: Andrea Bundon; Robbi Wheldon; Guides: Phil Wood	4 x 2.5km mixed relay	did not finish	

== Ice sledge hockey ==
Roster

No.	Pos.	Name	Height	Weight	Birthdate	Hometown	2012–13 team
22	G	Benoit St-Amand	5 ft 10 in (178 cm)	166 lb (75 kg)	19 April 1978	St-Hubert, QC	Team Canada
30	G	Corbin Watson	5 ft 11 in (180 cm)	193 lb (88 kg)	6 January 1987	Kingsville, ON	Team Canada
4	D	Derek Whitson	6 ft 1 in (185 cm)	167 lb (76 kg)	21 June 1989	Chatham, ON	Team Canada
11	D	Adam Dixon	5 ft 9 in (175 cm)	176 lb (80 kg)	13 August 1989	Midland, ON	Team Canada
14	D	Steve Arsenault	5 ft 7 in (170 cm)	177 lb (80 kg)	6 September 1988	Spruce Grove, AB	Team Canada
25	D	James Gemmell	5 ft 11 in (180 cm)	175 lb (79 kg)	26 April 1980	Quesnel, BC	Team Canada
29	D	Graeme Murray	5 ft 5 in (165 cm)	179 lb (81 kg)	14 December 1984	Gravenhurst, ON	Team Canada
5	F	Kevin Rempel	6 ft 1 in (185 cm)	199 lb (90 kg)	15 September 1982	Vineland, ON	Team Canada
7	F	Marc Dorion	5 ft 0 in (152 cm)	137 lb (62 kg)	22 June 1987	Bourget, ON	Team Canada
8	F	Tyler McGregor	5 ft 9 in (175 cm)	153 lb (69 kg)	11 March 1994	Forest, ON	Team Canada
9	F	Anthony Gale	5 ft 0 in (152 cm)	163 lb (74 kg)	12 May 1993	Brampton, ON	Team Canada
10	F	Ben Delaney	5 ft 11 in (180 cm)	154 lb (70 kg)	23 August 1996	Ottawa, ON	Team Canada
12	F	Greg Westlake	6 ft 2 in (188 cm)	173 lb (78 kg)	12 June 1986	Oakville, ON	Team Canada
18	F	Billy Bridges	5 ft 8 in (173 cm)	190 lb (86 kg)	22 March 1984	Summerside, PE	Team Canada
20	F	Karl Ludwig	4 ft 10 in (147 cm)	128 lb (58 kg)	25 November 1988	Brampton, ON	Team Canada
26	F	Dominic Larocque	6 ft 0 in (183 cm)	184 lb (83 kg)	30 July 1987	Quebec City, QC	Team Canada
27	F	Bradley Bowden	5 ft 0 in (152 cm)	161 lb (73 kg)	26 May 1983	Orton, ON	Team Canada

Preliminaries

Pos	Team	Pld	W	OTW	OTL	L	GF	GA	GD	Pts	Qualification
1	Canada	3	3	0	0	0	15	1	+14	9	Semifinals
2	Norway	3	1	1	0	1	4	5	−1	5	Semifinals
3	Czech Republic	3	0	1	1	1	3	4	−1	3	5–8th place semifinals
4	Sweden	3	0	0	1	2	2	14	−12	1	5–8th place semifinals

Source: Sochi 2014

8 March 2014; 13:00	Canada	10–1 (4–0, 3–0, 3–1)	Sweden	Shayba Arena; Attendance: 1,707

Game reference

Benoit St-Amand
Goalies
Ulf Nilsson
Kenth Jonsson
Referee:
(Norway) Petter Hegle
Linesmen:
(Poland) Tomasz Heltman
(Russia) Sergey Yudakov

Bridges (Whitson) – 01:03	1–0
Delaney (Gale, Murray) – 06:42	2–0
Gale (McGregor) – 12:30	3–0
Larocque (Dixon, Rempel) – 13:03	4–0
Dixon (Westlake, Dorion) – 26:47	5–0
Murray (Gale) – 27:40	6–0
Westlake (Dixon, Rempel) (PP) – 29:45	7–0
	7–1	35:22 – Kasperi (Rakos, Ingvarsson)
Dixon (Rempel, Bowden) (PP) – 40:12	8–1
Larocque (Rempel, Arsenault) – 40:32	9–1
Gale (Whitson, McGregor) – 41:30	10–1

2 min
Penalties
10 min
31
Shots
5

9 March 2014; 13:00	Canada	4–0 (0–0, 2–0, 2–0)	Norway	Shayba Arena; Attendance: 4,879

Game reference

Corbin Watson
Goalies
Kristian Buen
Referee:
(United States) Derek Berkebile
Linesmen:
(South Korea) Chae Young-jin
(United States) Brian Frerichs

Larocque (McGregor, Gale) (PP) – 19:20	1–0
Dixon (Gale, Bridges) – 25:34	2–0
Dixon (Arsenault, Rempel) – 31:07	3–0
Dorion (Larocque, Rempel) – 44:38	4–0

6 min
Penalties
6 min
23
Shots
6

11 March 2014; 20:00	Canada	1–0 (0–0, 1–0, 0–0)	Czech Republic	Shayba Arena; Attendance: 4,069

Game reference
Corbin Watson	Goalies	Michal Vápenka	Referee: (Russia) Igor Samoylov; Linesmen: (United States) Brian Frerichs (Russia) Sergey Yudakov
Westlake (Bridges) – 22:33 / 1–0			Referee: (Russia) Igor Samoylov; Linesmen: (United States) Brian Frerichs (Russia) Sergey Yudakov
4 min	Penalties	8 min	Referee: (Russia) Igor Samoylov; Linesmen: (United States) Brian Frerichs (Russia) Sergey Yudakov
19	Shots	7	Referee: (Russia) Igor Samoylov; Linesmen: (United States) Brian Frerichs (Russia) Sergey Yudakov

Semifinal

13 March 2014; 20:00	Canada	0–3 (0–2, 0–1, 0–0)	United States	Shayba Arena; Attendance: 5,150

Game reference

Corbin Watson
Goalies
Steve Cash
Referee:
(Canada) Paul Boese
Linesmen:
(Russia) Dmitriy Klochkov
(Russia) Sergey Yudakov

0–1	09:12 – Farmer (Pauls, Landeros)
0–2	14:04 – Farmer (Chace)
0–3	19:55 – Pauls (Farmer)

4 min
Penalties
6 min
11
Shots
10

Bronze Medal Game

15 March 2014; 13:00	Canada	3–0 (0–0, 3–0, 0–0)	Norway	Shayba Arena; Attendance: 4,823

Game reference

Corbin Watson
Goalies
Kristian Buen
Referee:
(United States) Jonhnathan Morrison
Linesmen:
(United States) Brian Frerichs
(Russia) Sergey Yudakov

Bowden (Arsenault) – 15:30	1–0
Bridges (Westlake, Bowden) – 17:22	2–0
Bridges (Dixon, Bowden) (PP) – 21:42	3–0

6 min
Penalties
10 min
18
Shots
10

== Wheelchair curling ==
Team

Position	Curler
Skip	Jim Armstrong
Third	Dennis Thiessen
Second	Ina Forrest
Lead	Sonja Gaudet
Alternate	Mark Ideson

Standings

Final round robin standings
Team	Skip	Pld	W	L	PF	PA	Qualification
Russia	Andrei Smirnov	9	8	1	60	38	Playoffs
Canada	Jim Armstrong	9	7	2	66	42	Playoffs
China	Wang Haitao	9	5	4	54	45	Playoffs
Great Britain	Aileen Neilson	9	5	4	53	56	Playoffs
United States	Patrick McDonald	9	4	5	56	52	
Slovakia	Radoslav Ďuriš	9	4	5	47	68	
Sweden	Jalle Jungnell	9	4	5	59	49	
Norway	Rune Lorentsen	9	3	6	47	62	
South Korea	Kim Myung-jin	9	3	6	41	74	
Finland	Markku Karjalainen	9	2	7	61	58	

Results

Draw 1

Saturday, March 8, 9:30

Sheet C	1	2	3	4	5	6	7	8	Final
Canada (Armstrong) 🔨	0	0	2	0	1	1	1	1	6
Great Britain (Neilson)	1	1	0	1	0	0	0	0	3

Draw 2

Saturday, March 8, 15:30

Sheet B	1	2	3	4	5	6	7	8	Final
Canada (Armstrong) 🔨	0	1	0	2	0	1	0	1	5
Russia (Smirnov)	1	0	1	0	1	0	1	0	4

Draw 4

Sunday, March 9, 15:30

Sheet A	1	2	3	4	5	6	7	8	Final
Canada (Armstrong)	1	0	1	1	2	0	1	1	7
Sweden (Jungnell) 🔨	0	2	0	0	0	2	0	0	4

Draw 5

Monday, March 10, 9:30

Sheet B	1	2	3	4	5	6	7	8	Final
United States (McDonald) 🔨	0	1	0	1	0	0	0	X	2
Canada (Armstrong)	1	0	2	0	2	1	1	X	7

Draw 6

Monday, March 10, 15:30

Sheet D	1	2	3	4	5	6	7	8	EE	Final
Canada (Armstrong) 🔨	2	0	2	0	0	2	0	0	0	6
Norway (Lorentsen)	0	1	0	1	1	0	2	1	2	8

Draw 8

Tuesday, March 11, 15:30

Sheet A	1	2	3	4	5	6	7	8	Final
China (Wang)	1	1	1	1	0	1	0	0	5
Canada (Armstrong) 🔨	0	0	0	0	3	0	4	1	8

Draw 9

Wednesday, March 12, 9:30

Sheet B	1	2	3	4	5	6	7	8	Final
Canada (Armstrong) 🔨	0	3	2	0	1	0	4	X	10
South Korea (Kim)	1	0	0	1	0	2	0	X	4

Draw 11

Thursday, March 13, 9:30

Sheet C	1	2	3	4	5	6	7	8	Final
Slovakia (Ďuriš) 🔨	0	0	0	0	0	0	X	X	0
Canada (Armstrong)	3	4	2	3	2	2	X	X	16

Draw 12

Thursday, March 13, 15:30

Sheet D	1	2	3	4	5	6	7	8	Final
Finland (Karjalainen) 🔨	2	5	1	1	3	0	X	X	12
Canada (Armstrong)	0	0	0	0	0	1	X	X	1

Semifinal

Saturday, March 15, 9:30

Team	1	2	3	4	5	6	7	8	Final
Canada (Armstrong) 🔨	1	1	0	1	0	0	2	0	5
China (Wang)	0	0	1	0	1	1	0	1	4

Gold medal game

Saturday, March 15, 15:30

Team	1	2	3	4	5	6	7	8	Final
Russia (Smirnov) 🔨	2	0	0	0	0	0	1	X	3
Canada (Armstrong)	0	1	1	2	1	3	0	X	8

== See also ==
- Canada at the Paralympics
- Canada at the 2014 Winter Olympics
