= Norway at the 2014 Winter Paralympics =

- IPC code: NOR
- NPC: Norwegian Olympic and Paralympic Committee and Confederation of Sports
- Website: www.idrett.no (in Norwegian)

in Sochi
- Competitors: 31 in 5 sports
- Medals Ranked 11th: Gold 1 Silver 2 Bronze 1 Total 4

Winter Paralympics appearances (overview)
- 1976; 1980; 1984; 1988; 1992; 1994; 1998; 2002; 2006; 2010; 2014; 2018; 2022; 2026

Norway competed at the 2014 Winter Paralympics in Sochi, Russia, held between 7–16 March 2014.

== Alpine skiing ==
Men

Athlete	Event	Run 1			Run 2			Final/Total		
Athlete	Event	Time	Diff	Rank	Time	Diff	Rank	Time	Diff	Rank
Mads Andreassen	Slalom, standing	1:00.74	+13.05	31	1:03.15	+11.87	22	2:03.89	+24.92	24
Mads Andreassen	Giant slalom, standing	1:26.84	+12.12	25	1:22.08	+10.93	20	2:48.92	+23.05	21
Thomas Jacobsen	Super-G, sitting	—N/a						DNF		
Thomas Jacobsen	Combined, sitting	1:17.16	+18.45	10	1:30.93	+12.66	9	2:48.09	+29.89	9
Thomas Jacobsen	Slalom, sitting	1:10.61	+17.87	24	1:19.60	+20.17	15	2:30.21	+36.43	15
Thomas Jacobsen	Giant slalom, sitting	DNS								

== Biathlon ==
Men

Athlete	Events	Final				
Athlete	Events	Real Time	Calculated Time	Missed Shots	Result	Rank
Trygve Steinar Larsen	7.5km, sitting	23:00.2	23:00.2	0+0	23:00.2	8
Trygve Steinar Larsen	12.5km, sitting	41:18.1	41:18.1	1+1+2+0	41:18.1	17
Trygve Steinar Larsen	15km, sitting	46:58.6	46:58.6	0+0+0+0	46:58.6	9
Nils-Erik Ulset	7.5km, standing	21:52.7	19:28.3	0+0	19:28.3	6
Nils-Erik Ulset	12.5km, standing	34:10.1	30:24.6	0+0+0+2	30:24.6	2nd place, silver medalist(s)
Nils-Erik Ulset	15km, standing	42:24.1	37:44.2	0+0+0+0	37:44.2	2nd place, silver medalist(s)

== Cross-country skiing ==
Men

Athlete	Event	Qualification			Semifinal		Final		
Athlete	Event	Real Time	Result	Rank	Result	Rank	Real Time	Result	Rank
Erik Bye; Guide: Kristian Myhre Hellerud	1km sprint classic, visually impaired	3:59.27	3:59.27	11	did not qualify				
Erik Bye; Guide: Kristian Myhre Hellerud	10km free, visually impaired	—N/a					28:15.1	28:15.1	14
Erik Bye; Guide: Kristian Myhre Hellerud	20km, visually impaired	—N/a					59:21.5	59:21.5	8
Trygve Steinar Larsen	1km sprint classic, sitting	2:20.12	2:20.12	12Q	2:27.5	4	did not advance		
Trygve Steinar Larsen	10km free, sitting	—N/a					did not start		
Hakon Olsrud	1km sprint classic, standing	4:07.25	3:59.83	15	did not qualify				
Hakon Olsrud	10km free, standing	—N/a					27:11.6	26:22.7	18
Nils-Erik Ulset	10km free, standing	—N/a					27:39.5	24:37.0	6

Women

Athlete	Event	Qualification			Semifinal		Final		
Athlete	Event	Real Time	Result	Rank	Result	Rank	Real Time	Result	Rank
Marie Karlsen	5km, standing	—N/a					22:32.1	20:16.9	17
Marie Karlsen	15km, standing	—N/a					1:02:10.0	55:57.0	7
Mariann Marthinsen	1km sprint classic, sitting	2:30.61	2:30.61	1Q	2:57.7	1Q	2:45.6	2:45.6	1st place, gold medalist(s)
Mariann Marthinsen	5km, sitting	—N/a					18:39.0	18:39.0	15
Mariann Marthinsen	12km, sitting	—N/a					40:00.8	40:00.8	4
Anne Karen Olsen	1km sprint classic, standing	5:22.65	5:09.74	11Q	5:19.9	6	did not advance		
Anne Karen Olsen	5km, standing	—N/a					16:25.9	15:46.5	13
Anne Karen Olsen	15km, standing	—N/a					DNF		
Birgit Skarstein	1km sprint classic, sitting	2:50.76	2:40.51	7Q	3:11.2	6	did not advance		
Birgit Skarstein	5km, sitting	—N/a					19:11.7	18:02.6	12
Birgit Skarstein	12km, sitting	—N/a					46:22.8	43:35.8	12

Relay

Athletes	Event	Final	
Athletes	Event	Time	Rank
Erik Bye; Guide: Kristian Myhre Hellerud; Mariann Marthinsen; Nils-Erik Ulset	4 x 2.5km mixed relay	27:53.6	3rd place, bronze medalist(s)

== Ice sledge hockey ==
Roster

- Ole Bjarte Austevoll
- Audun Bakke
- Magnus Bogle
- Kristian Buen
- Eskil Hagen
- Kjell Christian Hamar
- Martin Hamre
- Emil Kirstistuen
- Jan Roger Klakegg
- Knut Andre Nordstoga
- Rolf Einar Pedersen
- Tor Joakim Rivera
- Loyd-Remi Pallander Solberg
- Emil Sorheim
- Stig Tore Svee
- Morten Vaernes

Preliminaries

Pos	Team	Pld	W	OTW	OTL	L	GF	GA	GD	Pts	Qualification
1	Canada	3	3	0	0	0	15	1	+14	9	Semifinals
2	Norway	3	1	1	0	1	4	5	−1	5	Semifinals
3	Czech Republic	3	0	1	1	1	3	4	−1	3	5–8th place semifinals
4	Sweden	3	0	0	1	2	2	14	−12	1	5–8th place semifinals

Source: Sochi 2014

8 March 2014; 09:30	Czech Republic	1–2 GWS (0–0, 0–1, 1–0) (OT: 0–0) (SO: 0–1)	Norway	Shayba Arena; Attendance: 1,443

Game reference
Michal Vápenka	Goalies	Kristian Buen	Referee: (United States) Johnathan Morrison; Linesmen: (Netherlands) Louis Beelen (United States) Brian Frerichs
/ 0–1 / 24:28 – Bakke (Solberg, Bøgle); Geier (Hrbek, Šafránek) – 31:17 / 1–1			Referee: (United States) Johnathan Morrison; Linesmen: (Netherlands) Louis Beelen (United States) Brian Frerichs
Geier (miss); Berger (miss)	Shootout	Pedersen; Bakke	Referee: (United States) Johnathan Morrison; Linesmen: (Netherlands) Louis Beelen (United States) Brian Frerichs
0 min	Penalties	2 min	Referee: (United States) Johnathan Morrison; Linesmen: (Netherlands) Louis Beelen (United States) Brian Frerichs
21	Shots	14	Referee: (United States) Johnathan Morrison; Linesmen: (Netherlands) Louis Beelen (United States) Brian Frerichs

9 March 2014; 13:00	Canada	4–0 (0–0, 2–0, 2–0)	Norway	Shayba Arena; Attendance: 4,879

Game reference

Corbin Watson
Goalies
Kristian Buen
Referee:
(United States) Derek Berkebile
Linesmen:
(South Korea) Chae Young-jin
(United States) Brian Frerichs

Larocque (McGregor, Gale) (PP) – 19:20	1–0
Dixon (Gale, Bridges) – 25:34	2–0
Dixon (Arsenault, Rempel) – 31:07	3–0
Dorion (Larocque, Rempel) – 44:38	4–0

6 min
Penalties
6 min
23
Shots
6

11 March 2014; 13:00	Norway	2–0 (0–0, 1–0, 1–0)	Sweden	Shayba Arena; Attendance: 4,359

Game reference
Kristian Buen; Kjell Christian Hamar	Goalies	Ulf Nilsson	Referee: (Czech Republic) Jan Vaněk; Linesmen: (South Korea) Chae Young-jin (Canada) Matthew Clark
Bøgle (Solberg) – 20:40 / 1–0; Bakke (Pedersen, Solberg) – 34:35 / 2–0			Referee: (Czech Republic) Jan Vaněk; Linesmen: (South Korea) Chae Young-jin (Canada) Matthew Clark
4 min	Penalties	6 min	Referee: (Czech Republic) Jan Vaněk; Linesmen: (South Korea) Chae Young-jin (Canada) Matthew Clark
11	Shots	7	Referee: (Czech Republic) Jan Vaněk; Linesmen: (South Korea) Chae Young-jin (Canada) Matthew Clark

Semifinal

13 March 2014; 13:00	Russia	4–0 (2–0, 0–0, 2–0)	Norway	Shayba Arena; Attendance: 5,246

Game reference

Vladimir Kamantsev
Goalies
Kristian Buen
Referee:
(United States) Jonhnathan Morrison
Linesmen:
(Canada) Matthew Clark
(United States) Brian Frerichs

Lisov (Shikhov) – 05:40	1–0
Amosov (Shikhov, Dvinyaninov) – 12:55	2–0
Terentyev (Shikhov) – 34:27	3–0
Petrov (Kuznetsov) (ENG) – 44:23	4–0

4 min
Penalties
6 min
20
Shots
6

Bronze Medal Game

15 March 2014; 13:00	Canada	3–0 (0–0, 3–0, 0–0)	Norway	Shayba Arena; Attendance: 4,823

Game reference

Corbin Watson
Goalies
Kristian Buen
Referee:
(United States) Jonhnathan Morrison
Linesmen:
(United States) Brian Frerichs
(Russia) Sergey Yudakov

Bowden (Arsenault) – 15:30	1–0
Bridges (Westlake, Bowden) – 17:22	2–0
Bridges (Dixon, Bowden) (PP) – 21:42	3–0

6 min
Penalties
10 min
18
Shots
10

== Wheelchair curling ==
Team

Position	Curler
Skip	Rune Lorentsen
Third	Jostein Stordahl
Second	Anne Mette Samdal
Lead	Terje Rafdal
Alternate	Sissel Løchen

Standings

Final round robin standings
Team	Skip	Pld	W	L	PF	PA	Qualification
Russia	Andrei Smirnov	9	8	1	60	38	Playoffs
Canada	Jim Armstrong	9	7	2	66	42	Playoffs
China	Wang Haitao	9	5	4	54	45	Playoffs
Great Britain	Aileen Neilson	9	5	4	53	56	Playoffs
United States	Patrick McDonald	9	4	5	56	52	
Slovakia	Radoslav Ďuriš	9	4	5	47	68	
Sweden	Jalle Jungnell	9	4	5	59	49	
Norway	Rune Lorentsen	9	3	6	47	62	
South Korea	Kim Myung-jin	9	3	6	41	74	
Finland	Markku Karjalainen	9	2	7	61	58	

Results

Draw 1

Saturday, March 8, 9:30

Sheet B	1	2	3	4	5	6	7	8	Final
South Korea (Kim)	0	0	0	0	0	0	X	X	0
Norway (Lorentsen) 🔨	0	0	2	3	1	4	X	X	10

Draw 2

Saturday, March 8, 15:30

Sheet D	1	2	3	4	5	6	7	8	Final
Norway (Lorentsen)	0	1	0	0	1	1	0	X	3
China (Wang) 🔨	2	0	3	1	0	0	1	X	7

Draw 3

Saturday, March 9, 9:30

Sheet A	1	2	3	4	5	6	7	8	Final
United States (McDonald) 🔨	2	0	2	0	3	0	0	1	8
Norway (Lorentsen)	0	1	0	2	0	1	1	0	5

Draw 5

Monday, March 10, 9:30

Sheet C	1	2	3	4	5	6	7	8	EE	Final
Finland (Karjalainen) 🔨	0	1	0	2	0	0	2	1	0	6
Norway (Lorentsen)	1	0	2	0	2	1	0	0	2	8

Draw 6

Monday, March 10, 15:30

Sheet D	1	2	3	4	5	6	7	8	EE	Final
Canada (Armstrong) 🔨	2	0	2	0	0	2	0	0	0	6
Norway (Lorentsen)	0	1	0	1	1	0	2	1	2	8

Draw 8

Tuesday, March 11, 15:30

Sheet B	1	2	3	4	5	6	7	8	Final
Norway (Lorentsen) 🔨	0	1	0	0	0	2	0	X	3
Great Britain (Neilson)	1	0	1	1	1	0	3	X	7

Draw 9

Wednesday, March 12, 9:30

Sheet A	1	2	3	4	5	6	7	8	Final
Norway (Lorentsen) 🔨	0	0	1	0	0	3	0	X	4
Slovakia (Ďuriš)	3	2	0	1	2	0	3	X	11

Draw 10

Thursday, March 12, 15:30

Sheet C	1	2	3	4	5	6	7	8	Final
Norway (Lorentsen) 🔨	1	0	2	0	2	0	0	0	5
Russia (Smirnov)	0	2	0	1	0	1	1	1	6

Draw 11

Thursday, March 13, 9:30

Sheet D	1	2	3	4	5	6	7	8	Final
Sweden (Jungnell)	2	1	1	2	3	0	2	X	11
Norway (Lorentsen) 🔨	0	0	0	0	0	1	0	X	1

== See also ==
- Norway at the Paralympics
- Norway at the 2014 Winter Olympics
