= China at the 2014 Winter Paralympics =

- IPC code: CHN
- NPC: China Administration of Sports for Persons with Disabilities
- Website: www.caspd.org.cn

in Sochi
- Competitors: 10 in 2 sports
- Medals: Gold 0 Silver 0 Bronze 0 Total 0

Winter Paralympics appearances (overview)
- 2002; 2006; 2010; 2014; 2018; 2022; 2026

China competed at the 2014 Winter Paralympics in Sochi, Russia, held between 7–16 March 2014.

== Cross-country skiing ==
Men

Athlete	Event	Qualification			Semifinal		Final		
Athlete	Event	Real Time	Result	Rank	Result	Rank	Real Time	Result	Rank
Cheng Shishuai	1km sprint classic, standing	4:37.89	4:26.77	26	did not qualify				
Cheng Shishuai	10km free, standing	—N/a					30:50.5	29:36.5	28
Cheng Shishuai	20km, standing	—N/a					DNF		
Du Haitao	1km sprint classic, standing	4:43.24	4:09.25	17	did not qualify				
Du Haitao	10km free, standing	—N/a					35:42.7	31:25.6	35
Du Haitao	20km, standing	—N/a					DNF		
Liu Jianhui	1km sprint classic, standing	5:12.61	5:03.23	34	did not qualify				
Liu Jianhui	10km free, standing	—N/a					32:02.6	31:04.9	34
Liu Jianhui	20km, standing	—N/a					1:16:32.4	1:09:39.1	16
Tian Ye	1km sprint classic, standing	4:44.54	4:36.00	28	did not qualify				
Tian Ye	10km free, standing	—N/a					34:00.5	32:59.3	37
Tian Ye	20 km, standing	—N/a					1:17:35.5	1:10:36.5	17
Zou Dexin	1km sprint classic, standing	4:25.63	4:15.01	21	did not qualify				
Zou Dexin	10km free, standing	—N/a					29:01.0	27:51.4	24
Zou Dexin	20km, standing	—N/a					1:14:49.7	1:07:20.7	15

Relay

Athletes	Event	Final	
Athletes	Event	Time	Rank
Cheng Shishuai; Du Haitao; Liu Jianhui; Zou Dexin	4 x 2.5km open relay	29:25.8	7

== Wheelchair curling ==
Team

Position	Curler
Skip	Wang Haitao
Third	Zhang Qiang
Second	Liu Wei
Lead	Xu Gunagqin
Alternate	He Jun

Standings

Final round robin standings
Team	Skip	Pld	W	L	PF	PA	Qualification
Russia	Andrei Smirnov	9	8	1	60	38	Playoffs
Canada	Jim Armstrong	9	7	2	66	42	Playoffs
China	Wang Haitao	9	5	4	54	45	Playoffs
Great Britain	Aileen Neilson	9	5	4	53	56	Playoffs
United States	Patrick McDonald	9	4	5	56	52	
Slovakia	Radoslav Ďuriš	9	4	5	47	68	
Sweden	Jalle Jungnell	9	4	5	59	49	
Norway	Rune Lorentsen	9	3	6	47	62	
South Korea	Kim Myung-jin	9	3	6	41	74	
Finland	Markku Karjalainen	9	2	7	61	58	

Results

Draw 1

Saturday, 8 March, 9:30

Sheet A	1	2	3	4	5	6	7	8	Final
Russia (Smirnov) 🔨	0	1	1	0	1	1	0	1	5
China (Wang)	1	0	0	1	0	0	2	0	4

Draw 2

Saturday, 8 March, 15:30

Sheet D	1	2	3	4	5	6	7	8	Final
Norway (Lorentsen)	0	1	0	0	1	1	0	X	3
China (Wang) 🔨	2	0	3	1	0	0	1	X	7

Draw 3

Saturday, 9 March, 9:30

Sheet C	1	2	3	4	5	6	7	8	Final
China (Wang)	0	1	0	1	1	0	0	X	3
Slovakia (Ďuriš) 🔨	2	0	2	0	0	2	2	X	8

Draw 5

Monday, 10 March, 9:30

Sheet D	1	2	3	4	5	6	7	8	Final
China (Wang)	2	2	0	3	1	0	0	X	8
Sweden (Jungnell) 🔨	0	0	1	0	0	2	1	X	4

Draw 6

Monday, 10 March, 15:30

Sheet B	1	2	3	4	5	6	7	8	Final
South Korea (Kim)	1	0	0	1	0	0	0	X	2
China (Wang) 🔨	0	3	1	0	3	1	3	X	11

Draw 8

Tuesday, 11 March, 15:30

Sheet A	1	2	3	4	5	6	7	8	Final
China (Wang)	1	1	1	1	0	1	0	0	5
Canada (Armstrong) 🔨	0	0	0	0	3	0	4	1	8

Draw 9

Wednesday, 12 March, 9:30

Sheet C	1	2	3	4	5	6	7	8	Final
United States (McDonald) 🔨	1	1	1	1	0	2	4	X	10
China (Wang)	0	0	0	0	2	0	0	X	2

Draw 10

Wednesday, 12 March, 15:30

Sheet B	1	2	3	4	5	6	7	8	Final
China (Wang) 🔨	2	0	2	0	0	3	1	X	8
Finland (Karjalainen)	0	0	0	1	1	0	0	X	2

Draw 12

Thursday, 13 March, 15:30

Sheet A	1	2	3	4	5	6	7	8	Final
Great Britain (Neilson)	0	0	1	0	0	1	1	X	3
China (Wang) 🔨	1	1	0	3	1	0	0	X	6

=== Playoffs ===
Semifinal

Saturday, March 15, 9:30

Team	1	2	3	4	5	6	7	8	Final
Canada (Armstrong) 🔨	1	1	0	1	0	0	2	0	5
China (Wang)	0	0	1	0	1	1	0	1	4

Bronze Medal Game

Saturday, March 15, 15:30

Team	1	2	3	4	5	6	7	8	Final
Great Britain (Neilson)	0	0	2	2	1	1	1	X	7
China (Wang) 🔨	1	2	0	0	0	0	0	X	3

== See also ==
- China at the Paralympics
- China at the 2014 Winter Olympics
