= Finland at the 2014 Winter Paralympics =

- IPC code: FIN
- NPC: Finnish Paralympic Committee
- Website: www.paralympia.fi/en

in Sochi
- Competitors: 13 in 4 sports
- Medals Ranked 16th: Gold 0 Silver 1 Bronze 0 Total 1

Winter Paralympics appearances (overview)
- 1976; 1980; 1984; 1988; 1992; 1994; 1998; 2002; 2006; 2010; 2014; 2018; 2022; 2026

Finland competed at the 2014 Winter Paralympics in Sochi, Russia, held between 7–16 March 2014.

== Medalists ==
Medal	Name	Sport	Event	Date
Silver	Ilkka Tuomisto	Cross-country skiing	Men's 20 km classic standing	10 March

== Alpine skiing ==
Men

Athlete	Event	Race 1		Race 2		Race 3		Total	
Athlete	Event	Time	Rank	Time	Rank	Time	Rank	Time	Rank
Matti Suur-Hamari	Snowboard cross standing	57.37	8	DNF		1:02.19	14	1:59.56	11

Women

Athlete	Event	Run 1		Run 2		Total	
Athlete	Event	Time	Rank	Time	Rank	Time	Rank
Katja Saarinen	Slalom standing	did not finish					
Katja Saarinen	Giant slalom standing	1:40.56	15	1:26.43	12	3:06.99	12

== Biathlon ==
Men

Athlete	Event	Misses	Real Time	Calculated Time	Rank
Juha Härkönen	7.5 kilometres standing	0+1	23:53.2	23:10.2	17
Juha Härkönen	12.5 kilometres standing	3+1+3+0	40:20.4	39:07.8	18
Juha Härkönen	15 kilometres standing	1+1+0+1	45:36.9	47:14.8	15

Women

Athlete	Event	Misses	Real Time	Calculated Time	Rank
Maija Järvelä	6 kilometres standing	0+0	20:03.5	19:27.4	4
Maija Järvelä	10 kilometres standing	1+0+1+0	34:22.3	33:20.4	8
Maija Järvelä	12.5 kilometres standing	0+0+0+1	43:50.0	43:31.1	8

== Cross-country skiing ==
Men

Athlete	Event	Qualification			Semifinal		Final		
Athlete	Event	Real Time	Result	Rank	Result	Rank	Real Time	Result	Rank
Juha Härkönen	10km free, standing	—N/a					30:58.1	30:02.4	30
Lasse Kankkunen	1km sprint classic, standing	4:19.77	4:11.98	19	did not advance				
Lasse Kankkunen	10km free, standing	—N/a					29:02.1	28:09.8	27
Rudolf Klemetti; Guide:Timo Salminen	1km sprint classic, visually impaired	4:54.36	4:48.47	15	did not advance				
Rudolf Klemetti; Guide:Timo Salminen	10km free, visually impaired	—N/a					30:52.9	30:15.8	16
Rudolf Klemetti; Guide:Timo Salminen	20km, visually impaired	—N/a					1:10:32.5	+17:55.4	11
Ilkka Tuomisto	1km sprint classic, standing	3:54.01	3:46.99	10 Q	4:12.2	5	did not advance		
Ilkka Tuomisto	10km free, standing	—N/a					25:42.0	24:55.7	7
Ilkka Tuomisto	20km, standing	—N/a					51:31.5	+36.4	2nd place, silver medalist(s)

Women

Athlete	Event	Qualification			Semifinal		Final		
Athlete	Event	Real Time	Result	Rank	Result	Rank	Real Time	Result	Rank
Maija Järvelä	1km sprint classic, standing	4:53.74	4:44.93	6 Q	4:47.4	3 Q	4:33.3	4:36.3	4
Maija Järvelä	5km, standing	—N/a					15:11.1	14:43.8	8
Sini Pyy	1km sprint classic, sitting	3:48.85	3:35.12	22	did not advance				
Sini Pyy	5km, sitting	—N/a					25:05.4	23:35.1	22

Relay

Athletes	Event	Final	
Athletes	Event	Time	Rank
Maija Järvelä; Juha Harkonen; Lasse Kankkunen; Rudolf Klemetti; Guide: Timo Salminen	4 x 2.5km open relay	29:55.1	8

== Wheelchair curling ==
Team

Position	Curler
Skip	Markku Karjalainen
Third	Sari Karjalainen
Second	Vesa Hellman
Lead	Tuomo Aarnikka
Alternate	Mina Mojtahedi

Round Robin

Final round robin standings
Team	Skip	Pld	W	L	PF	PA	Qualification
Russia	Andrei Smirnov	9	8	1	60	38	Playoffs
Canada	Jim Armstrong	9	7	2	66	42	Playoffs
China	Wang Haitao	9	5	4	54	45	Playoffs
Great Britain	Aileen Neilson	9	5	4	53	56	Playoffs
United States	Patrick McDonald	9	4	5	56	52	
Slovakia	Radoslav Ďuriš	9	4	5	47	68	
Sweden	Jalle Jungnell	9	4	5	59	49	
Norway	Rune Lorentsen	9	3	6	47	62	
South Korea	Kim Myung-jin	9	3	6	41	74	
Finland	Markku Karjalainen	9	2	7	61	58	

Draw 1

Sheet A	1	2	3	4	5	6	7	8	Final
Sweden (Jungnell)	0	3	1	0	1	1	1	0	7
Finland (Karjalainen) 🔨	3	0	0	2	0	0	0	1	6

Draw 2

Sheet D	1	2	3	4	5	6	7	8	Final
Finland (Karjalainen) 🔨	1	0	0	1	0	2	0	X	4
Russia (Smirnov)	0	1	1	0	2	0	3	X	7

Draw 3

Sheet B	1	2	3	4	5	6	7	8	Final
Finland (Karjalainen)	2	0	1	0	1	2	0	0	6
Slovakia (Ďuriš) 🔨	0	1	0	2	0	0	4	2	9

Draw 4

Sheet C	1	2	3	4	5	6	7	8	EE	Final
Finland (Karjalainen) 🔨	0	1	0	2	0	0	2	1	0	6
Norway (Lorentsen)	1	0	2	0	2	1	0	0	2	8

Draw 5

Sheet C	1	2	3	4	5	6	7	8	Final
Great Britain (Neilson)	0	0	1	0	0	3	0	X	4
Finland (Karjalainen) 🔨	1	4	0	3	5	0	0	X	13

Draw 6

Sheet D	1	2	3	4	5	6	7	8	Final
United States (McDonald)	1	0	1	3	0	1	1	0	7
Finland (Karjalainen) 🔨	0	1	0	0	4	0	0	1	6

Draw 7

Sheet B	1	2	3	4	5	6	7	8	Final
China (Wang) 🔨	2	0	2	0	0	3	1	X	8
Finland (Karjalainen)	0	0	0	1	1	0	0	X	2

Draw 8

Sheet A	1	2	3	4	5	6	7	8	Final
Finland (Karjalainen)	2	0	1	0	2	0	1	0	6
South Korea (Kim) 🔨	0	1	0	1	0	3	0	2	7

Draw 9

Sheet D	1	2	3	4	5	6	7	8	Final
Finland (Karjalainen) 🔨	2	5	1	1	3	0	X	X	12
Canada (Armstrong)	0	0	0	0	0	1	X	X	1

== See also ==
- Finland at the Paralympics
- Finland at the 2014 Winter Olympics
