= Wheelchair curling at the 2014 Winter Paralympics =

Wheelchair curling at the XI Paralympic Winter Games
- Venue: Ice Cube Curling Center
- Dates: 8–15 March 2014
- Competitors: 50 from 10 nations

Medalists
1st place, gold medalist(s)		Canada
2nd place, silver medalist(s)		Russia
3rd place, bronze medalist(s)		Great Britain

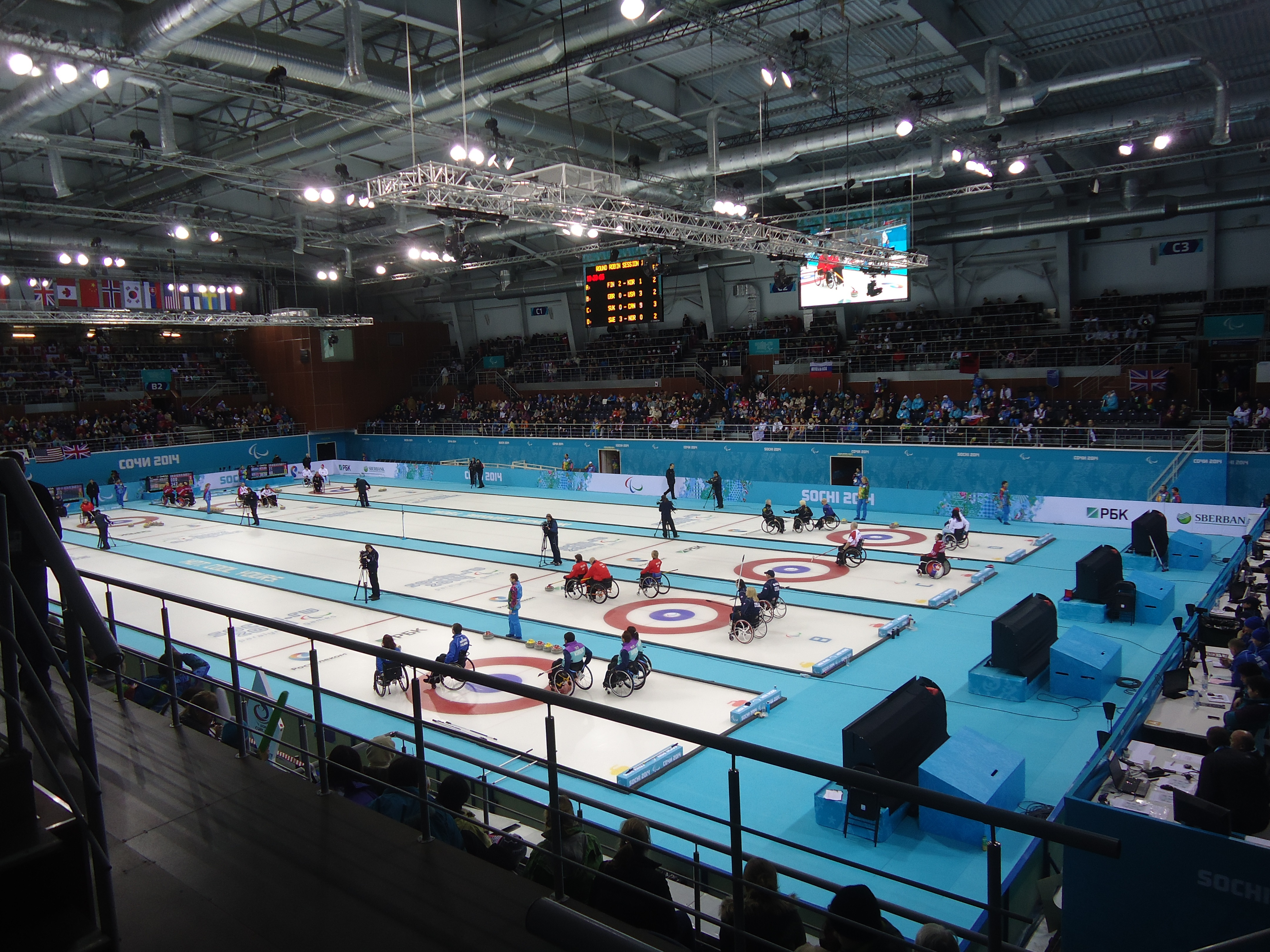
Wheelchair curling at the Ice Cube Curling Center, during the 2014 Winter Paralympics

The wheelchair curling competition of the 2014 Winter Paralympics was held from 8 to 15 March 2014 at the Ice Cube Curling Center in Sochi, Russia. Ten mixed teams competed.

== Qualification ==
Qualification for the 2014 Paralympics was based on rankings in the 2011, 2012, and 2013 World Wheelchair Curling Championships. The qualification points are allotted based on the nations' final rankings at the World Championships. The points are distributed as shown in the table below. The nine countries with the most points were to qualify for the Sochi Games, while the tenth slot was reserved for the host country, Russia. Because the Russian team placed within the top nine point-scorers, the tenth slot was given to the tenth-ranked team, Finland.

Final rank	1	2	3	4	5	6	7	8	9	10
Points	12	10	8	7	6	5	4	3	2	1

=== Standings ===
Key
Nations qualified for the Paralympic Games
Host nation (automatic qualification)

Country	(Czech Republic) 2011	(South Korea) 2012	(Russia) 2013	Total
Canada	12	4	12	28
Russia	7	12	6	25
China	6	8	8	22
Sweden	3	5	10	18
Great Britain (Note: Scotland, England and Wales all compete separately at the World Wheelchair Curling Championship. Under an agreement between the curling federations of those three home nations, only qualification points earned by Scotland count toward the point total for Great Britain.)	10	3	5	18
United States	4	6	7	17
South Korea	5	10	2	17
Slovakia	0	7	4	11
Norway	8	2	1	11
Finland	0	0	3	3
Germany	2	0	0	2
Italy	0	1	0	1
Czech Republic	1	0	0	1

== Medal table ==
* Host nation (Russia)

Rank	Nation	Gold	Silver	Bronze	Total
1	Canada (CAN)	1	0	0	1
2	Russia (RUS)*	0	1	0	1
3	Great Britain (GBR)	0	0	1	1
Totals (3 entries)		1	1	1	3

== Teams ==
The teams are listed as follows:

Canada	China	Finland	Great Britain	Norway
Skip: Jim Armstrong; Third: Dennis Thiessen; Second: Ina Forrest; Lead: Sonja Gaudet; Alternate: Mark Ideson; Coach: Joe Rea	Skip: Wang Haitao; Third: Zhang Qiang; Second: Liu Wei; Lead: Xu Guangqin; Alternate: He Jun; Coach: Li Jianrui	Skip: Markku Karjalainen; Third: Sari Karjalainen; Second: Vesa Hellman; Lead: Tuomo Aarnikka; Alternate: Mina Mojtahedi; Coach: Osku Kuutamo	Skip: Aileen Neilson; Third: Gregor Ewan; Second: Bob McPherson; Lead: Jim Gault; Alternate: Angie Malone; Coach: Tony Zummack	Skip: Rune Lorentsen; Third: Jostein Stordahl; Second: Anne Mette Samdal; Lead: Terje Rafdal; Alternate: Sissel Løchen; Coach: Ole Ingvaldsen
Russia	Slovakia	South Korea	Sweden	United States
Skip: Andrei Smirnov; Third: Alexander Shevchenko; Second: Svetlana Pakhomova; Lead: Marat Romanov; Alternate: Oksana Slesarenko; Coach: Anton Batugin	Skip: Radoslav Ďuriš; Third: Branislav Jakubec; Second: Dusan Pitoňák; Lead: Monika Kunkelová; Alternate: Alena Kánová; Coach: Frantisek Pitonak	Skip: Kim Myung-jin; Third: Kim Jong-pan; Second: Seo Soon-seok; Lead: Kang Mi-suk; Alternate: Yun Hee-keong; Coach: Ahn Jae-sung	Skip: Jalle Jungnell; Third: Glenn Ikonen; Second: Patrik Kallin; Lead: Kristina Ulander; Alternate: Zandra Reppe; Coach: Mats Mabergs	Skip: Patrick McDonald; Third: David Palmer; Second: Jimmy Joseph; Lead: Penny Greely; Alternate: Meghan Lino; Coach: Steve Brown

== Round-robin standings ==
Final round robin standings
Team	Skip	Pld	W	L	PF	PA	Qualification
Russia	Andrei Smirnov	9	8	1	60	38	Playoffs
Canada	Jim Armstrong	9	7	2	66	42	Playoffs
China	Wang Haitao	9	5	4	54	45	Playoffs
Great Britain	Aileen Neilson	9	5	4	53	56	Playoffs
United States	Patrick McDonald	9	4	5	56	52	
Slovakia	Radoslav Ďuriš	9	4	5	47	68	
Sweden	Jalle Jungnell	9	4	5	59	49	
Norway	Rune Lorentsen	9	3	6	47	62	
South Korea	Kim Myung-jin	9	3	6	41	74	
Finland	Markku Karjalainen	9	2	7	61	58	

== Round-robin results ==
All draw times are listed in Moscow Time (UTC+4).

=== Draw 1 ===
Saturday, March 8, 9:30

Sheet A	1	2	3	4	5	6	7	8	Final
Russia (Smirnov) 🔨	0	1	1	0	1	1	0	1	5
China (Wang)	1	0	0	1	0	0	2	0	4

Sheet B	1	2	3	4	5	6	7	8	Final
South Korea (Kim)	0	0	0	0	0	0	X	X	0
Norway (Lorentsen) 🔨	0	0	2	3	1	4	X	X	10

Sheet C	1	2	3	4	5	6	7	8	Final
Canada (Armstrong) 🔨	0	0	2	0	1	1	1	1	6
Great Britain (Neilson)	1	1	0	1	0	0	0	0	3

Sheet D	1	2	3	4	5	6	7	8	Final
Slovakia (Ďuriš)	2	1	0	0	1	1	0	1	6
United States (McDonald) 🔨	0	0	1	1	0	0	2	0	4

=== Draw 2 ===
Saturday, March 8, 15:30

Sheet A	1	2	3	4	5	6	7	8	Final
Sweden (Jungnell)	0	3	1	0	1	1	1	0	7
Finland (Karjalainen) 🔨	3	0	0	2	0	0	0	1	6

Sheet B	1	2	3	4	5	6	7	8	Final
Canada (Armstrong) 🔨	0	1	0	2	0	1	0	1	5
Russia (Smirnov)	1	0	1	0	1	0	1	0	4

Sheet C	1	2	3	4	5	6	7	8	Final
United States (McDonald) 🔨	0	1	0	3	0	1	0	X	5
South Korea (Kim)	3	0	3	0	2	0	1	X	9

Sheet D	1	2	3	4	5	6	7	8	Final
Norway (Lorentsen)	0	1	0	0	1	1	0	X	3
China (Wang) 🔨	2	0	3	1	0	0	1	X	7

=== Draw 3 ===
Sunday, March 9, 9:30

Sheet A	1	2	3	4	5	6	7	8	Final
United States (McDonald) 🔨	2	0	2	0	3	0	0	1	8
Norway (Lorentsen)	0	1	0	2	0	1	1	0	5

Sheet B	1	2	3	4	5	6	7	8	Final
Sweden (Jungnell)	0	0	1	0	3	0	0	0	4
Great Britain (Neilson) 🔨	1	0	0	1	0	2	1	1	6

Sheet C	1	2	3	4	5	6	7	8	Final
China (Wang)	0	1	0	1	1	0	0	X	3
Slovakia (Ďuriš) 🔨	2	0	2	0	0	2	2	X	8

Sheet D	1	2	3	4	5	6	7	8	Final
Finland (Karjalainen) 🔨	1	0	0	1	0	2	0	X	4
Russia (Smirnov)	0	1	1	0	2	0	3	X	7

=== Draw 4 ===
Sunday, March 9, 15:30

Sheet A	1	2	3	4	5	6	7	8	Final
Canada (Armstrong)	1	0	1	1	2	0	1	1	7
Sweden (Jungnell) 🔨	0	2	0	0	0	2	0	0	4

Sheet B	1	2	3	4	5	6	7	8	Final
Finland (Karjalainen)	2	0	1	0	1	2	0	0	6
Slovakia (Ďuriš) 🔨	0	1	0	2	0	0	4	2	9

Sheet D	1	2	3	4	5	6	7	8	Final
Great Britain (Neilson)	1	1	1	0	0	0	5	X	8
South Korea (Kim) 🔨	0	0	0	2	1	1	0	X	4

=== Draw 5 ===
Monday, March 10, 9:30

Sheet A	1	2	3	4	5	6	7	8	Final
South Korea (Kim)	1	0	2	0	0	0	2	0	5
Russia (Smirnov) 🔨	0	1	0	1	1	1	0	3	7

Sheet B	1	2	3	4	5	6	7	8	Final
United States (McDonald) 🔨	0	1	0	1	0	0	0	X	2
Canada (Armstrong)	1	0	2	0	2	1	1	X	7

Sheet C	1	2	3	4	5	6	7	8	EE	Final
Finland (Karjalainen) 🔨	0	1	0	2	0	0	2	1	0	6
Norway (Lorentsen)	1	0	2	0	2	1	0	0	2	8

Sheet D	1	2	3	4	5	6	7	8	Final
China (Wang)	2	2	0	3	1	0	0	X	8
Sweden (Jungnell) 🔨	0	0	1	0	0	2	1	X	4

=== Draw 6 ===
Monday, March 10, 15:30

Sheet A	1	2	3	4	5	6	7	8	Final
Slovakia (Ďuriš) 🔨	2	0	0	0	0	0	0	X	2
Great Britain (Neilson)	0	2	1	2	1	4	2	X	12

Sheet B	1	2	3	4	5	6	7	8	Final
South Korea (Kim)	1	0	0	1	0	0	0	X	2
China (Wang) 🔨	0	3	1	0	3	1	3	X	11

Sheet C	1	2	3	4	5	6	7	8	Final
Russia (Smirnov)	2	1	0	2	0	1	0	0	6
United States (McDonald) 🔨	0	0	1	0	1	0	1	2	5

Sheet D	1	2	3	4	5	6	7	8	EE	Final
Canada (Armstrong) 🔨	2	0	2	0	0	2	0	0	0	6
Norway (Lorentsen)	0	1	0	1	1	0	2	1	2	8

=== Draw 7 ===
Tuesday, March 11, 9:30

Sheet B	1	2	3	4	5	6	7	8	Final
Russia (Smirnov) 🔨	0	1	2	0	0	4	0	X	7
Sweden (Jungnell)	1	0	0	1	1	0	1	X	4

Sheet C	1	2	3	4	5	6	7	8	Final
Great Britain (Neilson)	0	0	1	0	0	3	0	X	4
Finland (Karjalainen) 🔨	1	4	0	3	5	0	0	X	13

Sheet D	1	2	3	4	5	6	7	8	Final
South Korea (Kim)	0	0	0	0	2	4	1	X	7
Slovakia (Ďuriš) 🔨	1	1	1	1	0	0	0	X	4

=== Draw 8 ===
Tuesday, March 11, 15:30

Sheet A	1	2	3	4	5	6	7	8	Final
China (Wang)	1	1	1	1	0	1	0	0	5
Canada (Armstrong) 🔨	0	0	0	0	3	0	4	1	8

Sheet B	1	2	3	4	5	6	7	8	Final
Norway (Lorentsen) 🔨	0	1	0	0	0	2	0	X	3
Great Britain (Neilson)	1	0	1	1	1	0	3	X	7

Sheet C	1	2	3	4	5	6	7	8	Final
Sweden (Jungnell)	2	2	0	0	1	0	4	X	9
Slovakia (Ďuriš) 🔨	0	0	1	1	0	1	0	X	3

Sheet D	1	2	3	4	5	6	7	8	Final
United States (McDonald)	1	0	1	3	0	1	1	0	7
Finland (Karjalainen) 🔨	0	1	0	0	4	0	0	1	6

=== Draw 9 ===
Wednesday, March 12, 9:30

Sheet A	1	2	3	4	5	6	7	8	Final
Norway (Lorentsen) 🔨	0	0	1	0	0	3	0	X	4
Slovakia (Ďuriš)	3	2	0	1	2	0	3	X	11

Sheet B	1	2	3	4	5	6	7	8	Final
Canada (Armstrong) 🔨	0	3	2	0	1	0	4	X	10
South Korea (Kim)	1	0	0	1	0	2	0	X	4

Sheet C	1	2	3	4	5	6	7	8	Final
United States (McDonald) 🔨	1	1	1	1	0	2	4	X	10
China (Wang)	0	0	0	0	2	0	0	X	2

Sheet D	1	2	3	4	5	6	7	8	Final
Russia (Smirnov) 🔨	0	2	2	0	2	0	5	X	11
Great Britain (Neilson)	0	0	0	1	0	1	0	X	2

=== Draw 10 ===
Wednesday, March 12, 15:30

Sheet A	1	2	3	4	5	6	7	8	Final
Sweden (Jungnell)	0	2	0	0	0	1	0	X	3
United States (McDonald) 🔨	1	0	1	3	2	0	1	X	8

Sheet B	1	2	3	4	5	6	7	8	Final
China (Wang) 🔨	2	0	2	0	0	3	1	X	8
Finland (Karjalainen)	0	0	0	1	1	0	0	X	2

Sheet C	1	2	3	4	5	6	7	8	Final
Norway (Lorentsen) 🔨	1	0	2	0	2	0	0	0	5
Russia (Smirnov)	0	2	0	1	0	1	1	1	6

=== Draw 11 ===
Thursday, March 13, 9:30

Sheet A	1	2	3	4	5	6	7	8	Final
Finland (Karjalainen)	2	0	1	0	2	0	1	0	6
South Korea (Kim) 🔨	0	1	0	1	0	3	0	2	7

Sheet B	1	2	3	4	5	6	7	8	EE	Final
Great Britain (Neilson)	0	0	1	0	1	0	5	0	1	8
United States (McDonald) 🔨	2	1	0	2	0	1	0	1	0	7

Sheet C	1	2	3	4	5	6	7	8	Final
Slovakia (Ďuriš) 🔨	0	0	0	0	0	0	X	X	0
Canada (Armstrong)	3	4	2	3	2	2	X	X	16

Sheet D	1	2	3	4	5	6	7	8	Final
Sweden (Jungnell)	2	1	1	2	3	0	2	X	11
Norway (Lorentsen) 🔨	0	0	0	0	0	1	0	X	1

=== Draw 12 ===
Thursday, March 13, 15:30

Sheet A	1	2	3	4	5	6	7	8	Final
Great Britain (Neilson)	0	0	1	0	0	1	1	X	3
China (Wang) 🔨	1	1	0	3	1	0	0	X	6

Sheet B	1	2	3	4	5	6	7	8	Final
Slovakia (Ďuriš) 🔨	1	0	1	0	1	1	0	0	4
Russia (Smirnov)	0	1	0	1	0	0	3	2	7

Sheet C	1	2	3	4	5	6	7	8	Final
South Korea (Kim)	0	1	0	0	0	2	0	X	3
Sweden (Jungnell) 🔨	3	0	5	1	2	0	2	X	13

Sheet D	1	2	3	4	5	6	7	8	Final
Finland (Karjalainen) 🔨	2	5	1	1	3	0	X	X	12
Canada (Armstrong)	0	0	0	0	0	1	X	X	1

== Playoffs ==
Semifinals
1	Russia	13
4	Great Britain	4
2	Canada	5
3	China	4

Gold medal game
1	Russia	3
2	Canada	8
Bronze medal game
4	Great Britain	7
3	China	3

=== Semifinals ===
Saturday, March 15, 9:30

Team	1	2	3	4	5	6	7	8	Final
Russia (Smirnov) 🔨	1	3	0	7	1	0	1	X	13
Great Britain (Neilson)	0	0	3	0	0	1	0	X	4

Team	1	2	3	4	5	6	7	8	Final
Canada (Armstrong) 🔨	1	1	0	1	0	0	2	0	5
China (Wang)	0	0	1	0	1	1	0	1	4

=== Bronze medal game ===
Saturday, March 15, 15:30

Team	1	2	3	4	5	6	7	8	Final
Great Britain (Neilson)	0	0	2	2	1	1	1	X	7
China (Wang) 🔨	1	2	0	0	0	0	0	X	3

=== Gold medal game ===
Saturday, March 15, 15:30

Team	1	2	3	4	5	6	7	8	Final
Russia (Smirnov) 🔨	2	0	0	0	0	0	1	X	3
Canada (Armstrong)	0	1	1	2	1	3	0	X	8
