= David Chamberlain =

American cross-country skier (born 1975)

David Chamberlain (born December 25, 1975) is a cross-country skier from the United States. He was born and raised in Wilton, Maine and took up cross-country skiing in high school. He then attended Bates College, and was an All-American in skiing.

After entering the professional cross-country ski circuit, he signed with Fischer Skis and raced with Fischer Boots, Skis and Bindings, before signing with Atomic Skis, Alpina Sports, and Rottefella from 2004 until 2006, and Fischer for the 2008–2009 season.

As of 2014, Chamberlain lives in Bloomington, Minnesota with his wife BethAnn Chamberlain, who is a coach for US Paralympic Team. He was a skiing guide for United States at the 2014 Winter Paralympics.
