= China at the 2006 Winter Paralympics =

- IPC code: CHN
- NPC: China Administration of Sports for Persons with Disabilities
- Website: www.caspd.org.cn

in Turin
- Competitors: 8 in 2 sports
- Medals Ranked 20th: Gold 0 Silver 0 Bronze 0 Total 0

Winter Paralympics appearances (overview)
- 2002; 2006; 2010; 2014; 2018; 2022; 2026

China participated in the ninth Winter Paralympics in Turin, Italy.

== Athletes ==
China entered eight athletes in the following sports:

- Alpine skiing: 1 male
  - Wang Lei
- Nordic skiing: 4 males, 3 females
  - Fu Chunshan
  - Han Lixia
  - Peng Yuanyuan
  - Sun Qiu
  - Wang Jinyou
  - Zhang Jie
  - Zhang Nannan

== Medalists ==
	(gold)	(silver)	(bronze)	Total
China	0	0	0	0

== See also ==
- China at the 2006 Winter Olympics
