= 2014 Winter Paralympics closing ceremony =

- Part of 2014 Winter Paralympics
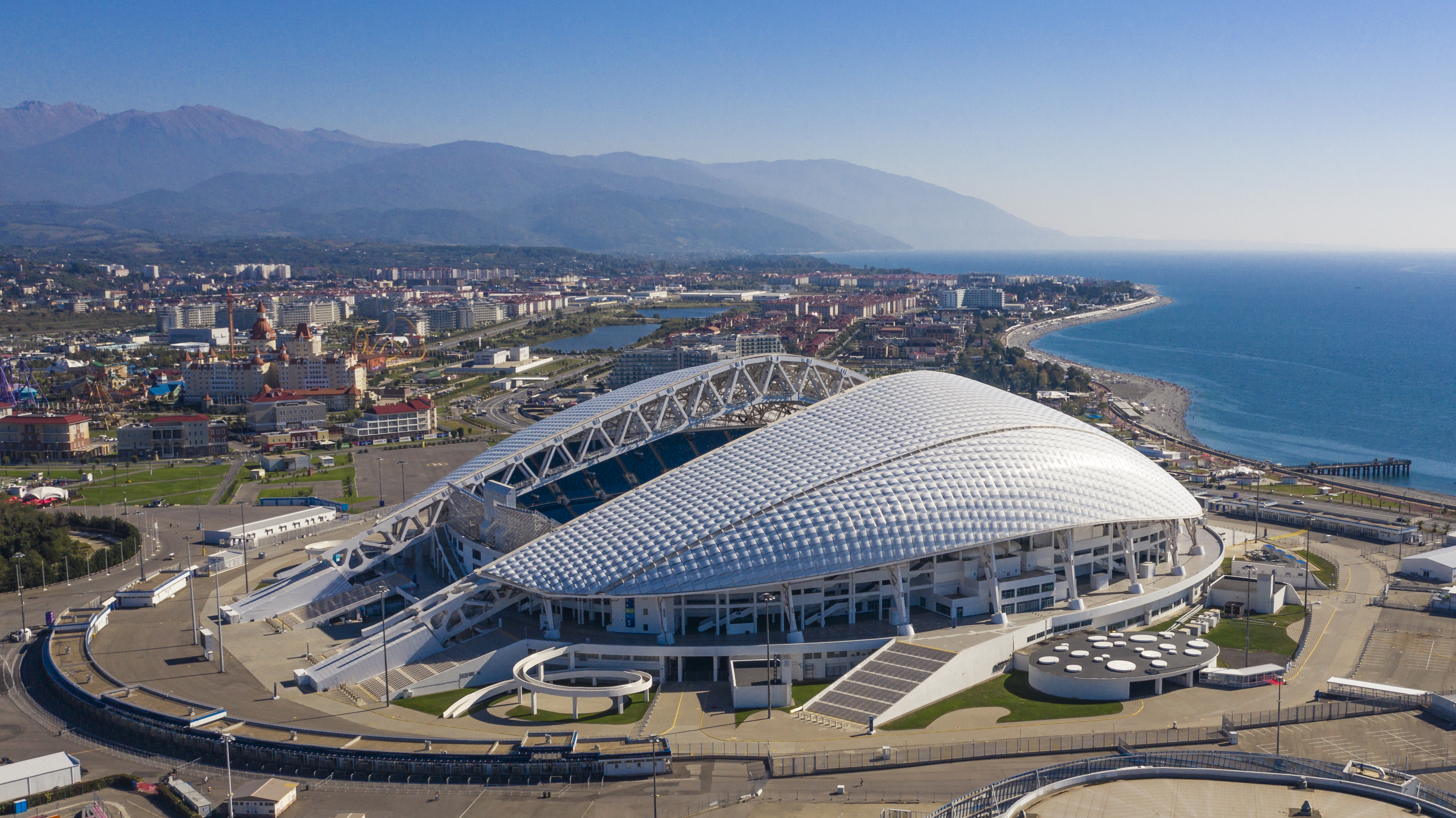
- Fisht Olympic Stadium hosted the closing ceremony.
- Date: 16 March 2014
- Time: 20:14 MSK (UTC+4)
- Venue: Fisht Olympic Stadium
- Location: Sochi, Russia; 43°24′08″N 39°57′22″E
- Also known as: Reaching the Impossible
- Filmed by: Olympic Broadcasting Services (OBS)

The closing ceremony of the 2014 Winter Paralympics was held on 16 March 2014 at 20:14 MSK (UTC+4) at the Fisht Olympic Stadium in Sochi, Russia.

== Awards ==
During the closing ceremony, Toby Kane, a male alpine skier from Australia, and Bibian Mentel-Spee, a female snowboarder from the Netherlands, were named winners of the Whang Youn Dai Achievement Award, which is presented at every Paralympic Games for outstanding performances and overcoming adversity.

The flag was handed over to the mayor of PyeongChang, the host city of the next edition of the Winter Paralympics.

== Anthems ==
- Russian State Children's Chorus Assembly – Russian national anthem
- Oleg Akkuratov – Paralympic anthem
- Seungwon Choi - South Korean national anthem
