= 2014 Winter Paralympics =

Multi-parasport event in Sochi, Russia

XI Paralympic Winter Games
- Location: Sochi, Russia
- Motto: Hot. Cool. Yours. (Russian: Жаркие. Зимние. Твои.)
- Nations: 45
- Athletes: 550
- Events: 72 in 5 sports
- Opening: 7 March 2014
- Closing: 16 March 2014
- Opened by: President Vladimir Putin
- Closed by: IPC President Philip Craven
- Cauldron: Sergey Shilov; Olesya Vladykina
- Stadium: Fisht Olympic Stadium

The 2014 Winter Paralympics (Russian: Зимние Паралимпийские игры 2014, romanized: Zimniye Paralimpiyskiye igry 2014), the 11th Paralympic Winter Games, and also more generally known as the Sochi 2014 Paralympic Winter Games, were an international multi-sport event for athletes with disabilities governed by the International Paralympic Committee (IPC), held in Sochi, Russia, from 7 to 16 March 2014. 45 National Paralympic Committees (NPCs) participated in the Games, which marked the first time Russia ever hosted the Paralympics. The Games featured 72 medal events in five sports, and saw the debut of snowboarding at the Winter Paralympics.

The lead-up to these Paralympics were met with concerns regarding Russia's military intervention in the nearby Crimean peninsula of Ukraine the month before the opening of the games. The head of Ukraine's NPC stated that it would pull its athletes if the situation escalated, while the United Kingdom and United States chose not to send governmental delegations to the Games. The crisis ultimately had no impact on athlete participation, but members of the Ukrainian team did stage symbolic protests of the crisis during the Games (including most notably, all but the country's flagbearer sitting out of the opening ceremony's parade of nations).

With 80 medals, 30 of them being gold, the host country of Russia won the most medals during these Games, and set a record for the most medals won by a single country during a single Winter Paralympic Games. Additionally, Russian skier Roman Petushkov won the most individual gold medals in Winter Paralympic history, with six golds across skiing and biathlon events. However, following the Games, the IPC discovered evidence that Russia's performance had been aided by a wider state-sponsored doping program. This resulted in restrictions on the participation of Russian athletes during subsequent Paralympics.

== Bidding process ==
As part of a formal agreement between the International Paralympic Committee and the International Olympic Committee first established in 2001, the winner of the bid for the 2014 Winter Olympics was also to host the 2014 Winter Paralympics. Following the second and final round of voting at the 119th IOC Session in Guatemala City, Guatemala on 4 July 2007, the city of Sochi, Russia was awarded the 2014 Winter Olympics and Paralympics.

2014 Host City Election – results
City	Country	Round 1	Round 2
Sochi	Russia	34	51
Pyeongchang	South Korea	36	47
Salzburg	Austria	25	—

== Organization ==
=== Venues ===
Location of Sochi on the eastern coast of the Black Sea in Europe.

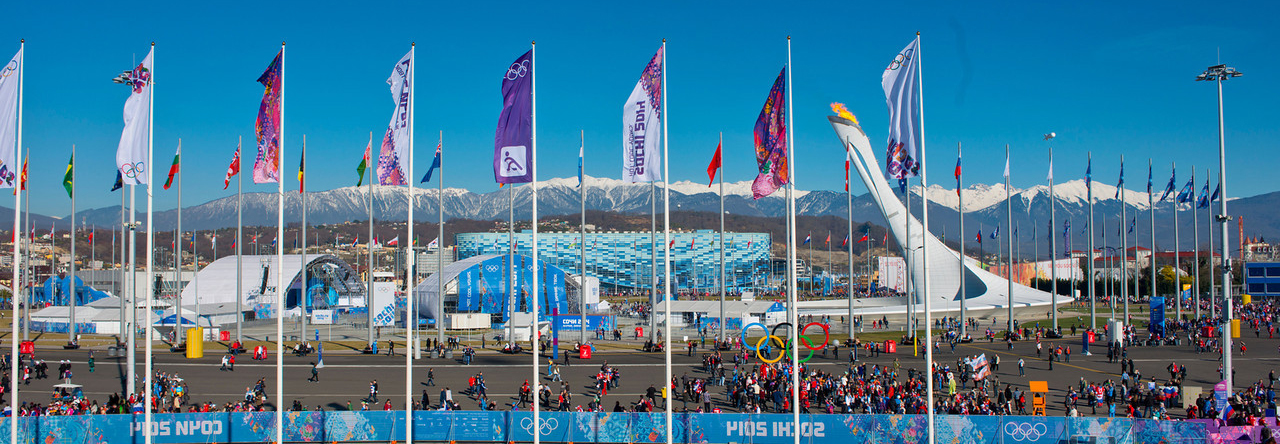
Panoramic view of the Sochi Olympic Park

As with previous Paralympics, the 2014 Winter Paralympics used most of the same venues that were used by the Olympics, situated within the Sochi Olympic Park and the resort of Krasnaya Polyana. Despite the IPC believing that Russia had "zero track record in terms of accessibility"—given that the Soviet Union passed on hosting the 1980 Summer Paralympics after claiming no disabled athletes lived in Russia, the venues were built to the IPC's standards, organizers were quick to fix some of the issues pointed out by officials during an audit of the venues in January 2014, and an IPC spokesperson stated that they were "confident and expect everything to be ready for Games time." Organizers and the IPC hoped that the Paralympics' legacy would make Sochi a role model for inclusive design throughout the country, and IPC president Philip Craven went as far as dubbing Sochi the first accessible city in Russia, commending the country's changed stance on disability since 1980.

=== Sochi Olympic Park (Coastal Cluster) ===
The Sochi Olympic Park was built by the Black Sea coast in the Imeretin Valley, about 4 km (2.5 miles) from Russia's border with Abkhazia. The venues are clustered around a central water basin with a synchronized fountain, allowing all indoor venues to be within walking distance. Off these, the venues used during the Paralympics included:

- Fisht Olympic Stadium – ceremonies (opening/closing) 40,000 spectators
- Shayba Arena – sledge hockey, 7,000 spectators
- Ice Cube Curling Center – wheelchair curling, 3,000 spectators
A sketch of the layout of Sochi Olympic Park.

=== Krasnaya Polyana (Mountain Cluster) ===
- Laura Biathlon & Ski Complex – Biathlon, Cross-country skiing
- Rosa Khutor Alpine Resort – Alpine skiing
- Rosa Khutor Extreme Park – Snowboarding
2014 Winter Paralympics Mountain Cluster Venues

== Mascots ==
Snowflake and Ray of Light ("Snezhinka" and "Luchik")

A shortlist of 10 Olympic and 3 Paralympic designs were shown to the public on 7 February 2011, while the winners were revealed on 26 February 2011. The Paralympic mascots, Ray of Light and Snowflake, represented contrasts and inclusivity: their fictional backstories portrayed them as having respectively come to Earth from a hot planet and a cold comet. After Ray of Light overcame his struggle to adapt to a winter environment, he bonded with Snowflake through a shared passion for winter sports.

== The Games ==
=== Opening ceremony ===
The opening ceremony of the Games were held at Fisht Olympic Stadium on 7 March 2014. Entitled "Breaking the Ice", the ceremony was themed around equality and "breaking" barriers, featuring ballet sequences set to music by notable Russian composers, and animated segments by Aleksandr Petrov based on the story of the firebird. In his opening speech, IPC president Philip Craven praised Russia for finally fulfilling its "dream" of hosting the Paralympics after previously passing on the opportunity in 1980. He called upon spectators to have a "barrier-free mind", stating that "the sport you witness here will change you. Not just for now, but forever." The Paralympic cauldron was jointly lit by Russian Paralympians Olesya Vladykina and Sergey Shilov.

=== Participating National Paralympic Committees ===
Athletes representing forty-five National Paralympic Committees (NPCs) competed at the 2014 Winter Paralympics, an increase of one NPC over 2010.

Participating National Paralympic Committees
- Andorra (1)
- Argentina (3)
- Armenia (1)
- Australia (9)
- Austria (13)
- Belarus (10)
- Belgium (2)
- Bosnia and Herzegovina (2)
- Brazil (2)
- Bulgaria (2)
- Canada (54)
- Chile (2)
- China (10)
- Croatia (2)
- Czech Republic (18)
- Denmark (2)
- Finland (13)
- France (14)
- Germany (13)
- Great Britain (12)
- Greece (1)
- Iceland (2)
- Iran (1)
- Italy (34)
- Japan (20)
- Kazakhstan (5)
- South Korea (27)
- Mexico (1)
- Mongolia (1)
- Netherlands (7)
- New Zealand (3)
- Norway (31)
- Poland (7)
- Romania (1)
- Russia (68) (host)
- Serbia (1)
- Slovakia (16)
- Slovenia (1)
- Spain (7)
- Sweden (22)
- Switzerland (8)
- Turkey (2)
- Ukraine (23)
- United States (74)
- Uzbekistan (2)

Brazil, Turkey and Uzbekistan made their Winter Paralympic debut in Sochi, while Hungary and South Africa, who participated in Vancouver, did not send any athletes.

=== Sports ===
Competitions in the 2014 Winter Paralympics were held in five Winter Paralympic sports, with 72 medal events in total. New for 2014 was the addition of snowboarding events, which were incorporated into the alpine skiing program.

- Alpine skiing (32) ()
- Biathlon (18) ()
- Cross-country skiing (20) ()
- Ice sledge hockey (1) ()
- Wheelchair curling (1) ()

=== Calendar ===
OC	Opening ceremony	●	Event competitions	#	Event finals	CC	Closing ceremony

March	7th Fri	8th Sat	9th Sun	10th Mon	11th Tue	12th Wed	13th Thu	14th Fri	15th Sat	16th Sun	Events
Ceremonies	OC									CC	
Alpine skiing		6	3	3	●	3	3	8	3	3	32
Biathlon		6			6			6			18
Cross-country skiing			2	4		6			2	6	20
Ice sledge hockey		●	●		●	●	●	●	1		1
Wheelchair curling		●	●	●	●	●	●	●	1		1
Total events		12	5	7	6	9	3	14	7	9	72
Cumulative total		12	17	24	30	39	42	56	63	72	
March	7th Fri	8th Sat	9th Sun	10th Mon	11th Tue	12th Wed	13th Thu	14th Fri	15th Sat	16th Sun	Events

=== Closing ceremony ===
The closing ceremony of the 2014 Winter Paralympics was held on 16 March 2014 at Fisht Olympic Stadium. Entitled "Reaching the Impossible", the ceremony was themed around inclusivity, and featured sequences paying tribute to Russian abstract artist Wassily Kandinsky, and Alexey Pajitnov's classic video game Tetris. During his closing remarks, deputy Prime Minister Dmitry Kozak stated that the Games had become a "catalyst for our efforts to create a barrier-free environment in Russia", and promised that "this important work will continue throughout our vast country." Sir Phillip Craven congratulated Russia for hosting what he deemed to be the best Winter Paralympic Games, and stated that the Games' participants had "shown the world that absolutely anything is possible and that life is about amazing capabilities and not perceived deficiencies."

== Medals ==
Sochi's Paralympic medal design was unveiled in May 2013 alongside its Olympic equivalent. The design incorporates a "patchwork quilt" of diamonds, some of which are translucent, containing designs that reflect Russia's regions, and also contain inscriptions in braille.

=== Medal table ===
* Host nation (Russia)

Rank	NPC	Gold	Silver	Bronze	Total
1	Russia (RUS)*	29	27	21	77
2	Germany (GER)	9	5	1	15
3	Canada (CAN)	7	2	7	16
4	Ukraine (UKR)	6	9	13	28
5	France (FRA)	5	3	4	12
6	Slovakia (SVK)	3	2	2	7
7	Japan (JPN)	3	1	2	6
8	United States (USA)	2	7	9	18
9	Austria (AUT)	2	5	4	11
10	Great Britain (GBR)	1	3	2	6
11–19	Remaining NPCs	5	9	6	20
Totals (19 entries)		72	73	71	216

== Broadcasting ==
In February 2013, following its successful broadcast of the 2012 Summer Paralympics, British broadcaster Channel 4 announced in February 2014 that it had obtained the broadcast rights to further Games, including the 2014 Winter Paralympics, and 2016 Summer Paralympics. Channel 4 planned to broadcast more than 45 hours of coverage from Sochi. Australian coverage was provided by the Australian Broadcasting Corporation, including live online streaming. However, aside from the opening ceremony (which was broadcast live), television coverage was limited to a daily half-hour highlights show.

In the United States, NBC Sports acquired the rights to the 2014 and 2016 Paralympics in September 2013. The majority of its coverage was broadcast on NBC Sports Network, and NBC aired highlights of the opening ceremony the following afternoon, and live coverage of the sledge hockey finals. CBC Sports, in conjunction with the Canadian Paralympic Committee, produced and syndicated television and digital coverage of the Games in Canada for CBC Television (30 hours), Ici Radio-Canada Télé (French, 7 hours), Sportsnet, AMI-tv (coverage with open described video), and Yahoo! Sports Canada.

== Concerns and controversies ==
Although concerns over LGBT rights still had a minor effect on the Games, they were overshadowed by a crisis in the Ukrainian region of Crimea which began during the Olympics, but became more severe immediately prior to the Paralympics.

=== Russian annexation of Crimea ===
On 27–28 February 2014 in the aftermath of the Ukrainian revolution, Russian troops seized control of most of the Crimean peninsula of Ukraine located on the northern coast of the Black Sea—roughly 480 kilometres (300 mi) from Sochi, including civil buildings, airports, and military bases. On 1 March 2014, the Russian legislature approved the use of the Russian military in Ukraine, and Russian officials stated that their military forces in Crimea were not a breach of existing agreements between Russia and Ukraine. The Ukrainian response has been muted trying to find a diplomatic solution, with no military action on the part of Ukraine's government, which was formed in Kyiv less than a week before the intervention. Russia vowed troops would stay until the political situation was "normalised". A referendum on whether Crimea would separate from Ukraine was held on 16 March 2014—the same day as the closing ceremony of these Games.

The effects of these developments led to several notable political actions surrounding the Paralympics. On 2 March 2014, British Prime Minister David Cameron announced that British government officials were planning to boycott the 2014 Winter Paralympics in response to the situation in Crimea, while Prince Edward cancelled plans to travel to Sochi for the Games "on the advice of government." On 3 March 2014, United States National Security Council spokeswoman Caitlin Hayden announced that the United States would not send a presidential delegation to Sochi (which was to be led by Tammy Duckworth) at all, "in addition to other measures we are taking in response to the situation in Ukraine." Neither of the boycotts affected the participation of their respective athletes in the Games; Hayden went on to say that "President Obama continues to strongly support all of the U.S. athletes who will participate in the Paralympics and wishes them great success".

IPC communications head Craig Spence reported prior to the Games that there were not any boycott efforts among athletes, and stated that although the organization would keep an eye on the situation in the Crimea, "we've obviously expressed our disappointment with what's going on in the political situation, but at the end of the day, we're not here to do politics. We're here to organize a sporting event." He went on to emphasize that the same level of security measures in place during the Olympics would be in place during the Paralympics, and ensured that Sochi would be the "safest place" in the country during the Games.

The Ukraine team still participated in the Games, but Valeriy Sushkevich, head of the country's National Paralympic Committee, warned that "if there is an escalation of the conflict, intervention on the territory of our country, God forbid the worst, we would not be able to stay here. We would go." As a symbolic protest, the Ukrainian team declined to participate in the opening ceremonies' parade of nations, sending only its flagbearer Mykailo Tkachenko—who entered to an ovation from the audience. Some Ukrainian medalists were seen covering their medal with their hand during ceremonies as another form of silent protest; Sushkevich stated that the covering was "a demonstration that aggression and the high ideals of Paralympic sports are incompatible."

=== Russian doping scandal ===
On 18 July 2016, the World Anti-Doping Agency published the first part of an independent report detailing a state-sponsored doping program in Russian Olympic and Paralympic sport, coordinated by the country's Ministry of Sport and Federal Security Service (FSB), where positive urine samples were swapped in favour of clean ones in order to evade detection. The IPC found evidence that swapping of positive samples had occurred during the 2014 Winter Paralympics.

On 7 August 2016, the International Paralympic Committee announced that it had suspended the Russian Paralympic Committee. The country was banned from the 2016 Summer Paralympics. At the 2018 Winter Paralympics, the RPC remained suspended, but the IPC did allow clean Russian athletes to compete neutrally under the Paralympic flag (mirroring a similar decision by the IOC for the 2018 Winter Olympics).

=== LGBT rights ===
Concerns surrounding LGBT rights in Russia and the country's "gay propaganda" law continued into the Paralympics. On 4 February 2014, Norway's openly gay health minister Bent Høie announced he would attend the Games with his husband, as is common for cabinet officials to travel with their spouses. The Federation of Gay Games also started a petition calling for IPC president Philip Craven not to attend the Games if Russian authorities did not allow the Russian Open Games, a multi-sport event for LGBT athletes which organizers attempted to hold prior to the Paralympics, to occur. These games were faced with a bomb threat, and its venues arbitrarily pulling out of providing their services for events, which was believed to be a result of government pressure.

== See also ==
- List of IOC country codes

Preceded by Vancouver	Winter Paralympics; Sochi; XI Paralympic Winter Games (2014)	Succeeded by Pyeongchang
