= Patrick McDonald (curler) =

American wheelchair curler

- Curler
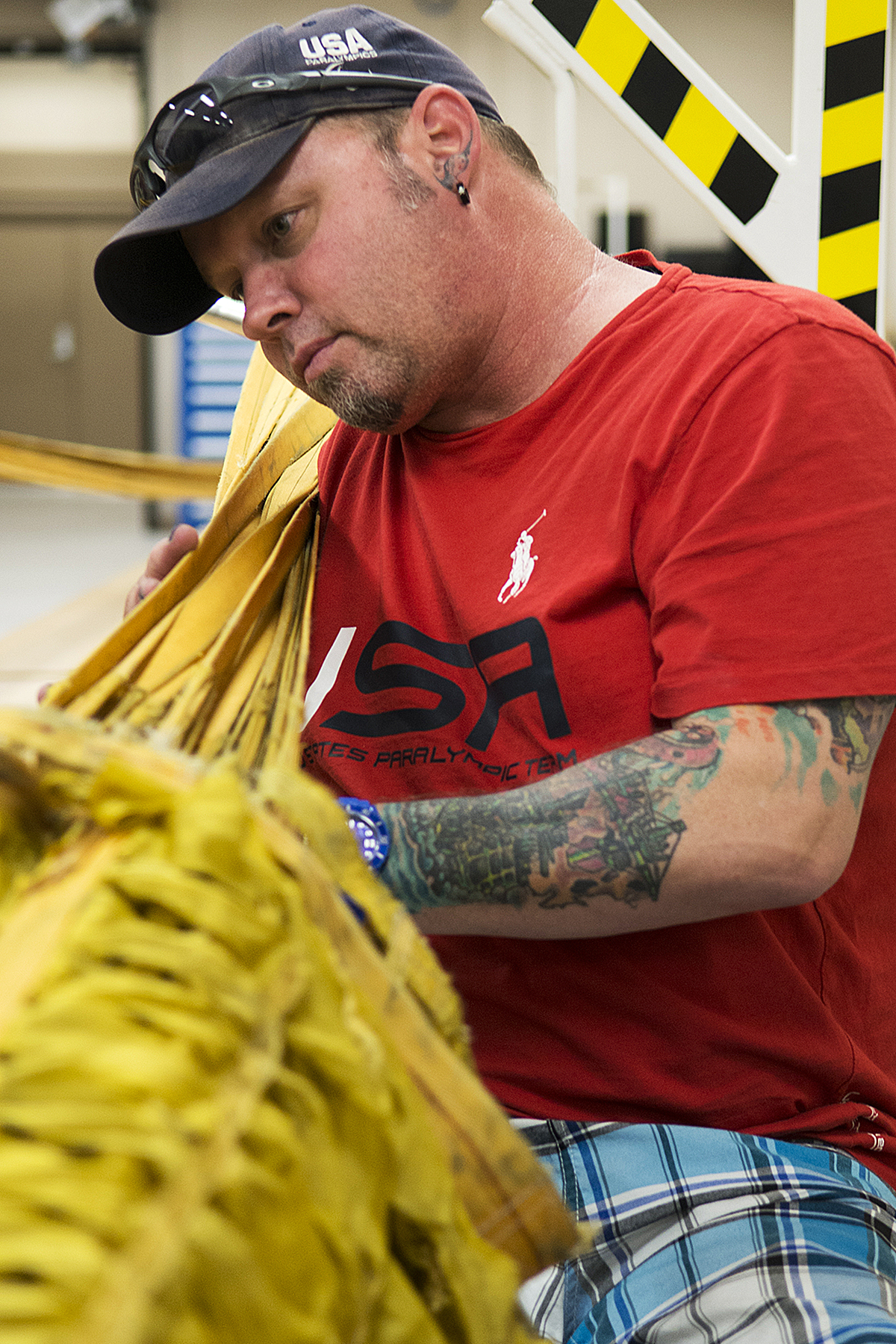
- McDonald helps repack a B-52H Stratofortress drag chute during a tour of Barksdale Air Force Base in 2014
- Born: June 9, 1967 (age 59)

Team
- Skip: Patrick McDonald
- Third: Steven Emt
- Second: James Joseph
- Lead: Penny Greely
- Alternate: Meghan Lino

Curling career
- World Championship: 4 (2009, 2012, 2013, 2015)
- Paralympic: 2 (2010, 2014)

Patrick McDonald (born June 9, 1967) is an American wheelchair curler based in Madison, Wisconsin.

== Career ==
McDonald first started curling in 2008. McDonald first represented the United States in international competition as the alternate for the American team at the 2009 World Wheelchair Curling Championship. He then represented the United States as third under skip Augusto Perez in the 2010 Winter Paralympics in Vancouver, where they finished fourth. McDonald became the skip of the United States wheelchair curling team in 2012, and led his team to a fifth-place finish in the world championship. He skipped the United States team at the 2013 World Wheelchair Curling Championship, and led his team to a fourth-place finish after losing in the semifinal to Canada's Jim Armstrong and losing a tight game to China in the bronze medal game. McDonald skipped the United States team at the 2014 Winter Paralympics, and finished tied for fifth after the round robin. He also skipped the United States team at the 2015 World Wheelchair Curling Championship. The United States team had a promising start, winning the first four of five games, but lost the final four games and finished in fifth place.

== Personal life ==
McDonald grew up around sports as a child. He enlisted in the military, and was stationed in South Korea in 1991 when he was involved in an accident which left him paralyzed. After some complications, he recovered and began to undergo rehabilitation in California, competing in various sports, including wheelchair basketball, swimming, and golf. He also competed in shooting and table tennis in hopes of qualifying for the 2008 Summer Paralympics, but fell short. He then began curling, and moved from California to Wisconsin in 2011 after having shoulder surgery. He currently resides in Madison, Wisconsin with his wife and two children.
