= Jalle Jungnell =

Swedish wheelchair curler

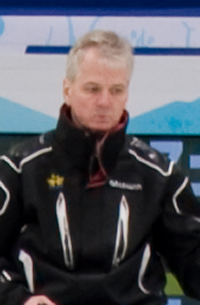

Jalle Jungnell (born 6 January 1954) is a Swedish Paralympic wheelchair curler. His team won bronze in Wheelchair curling at the 2006 Winter Paralympics and in the 2009 World wheelchair curling championship they won silver. He is also the founder and owner of Panthera, a wheelchair-manufacturer in Sweden.

In 2024, he was inducted into the World Curling Hall of Fame.

== Results ==
Paralympic Games
Finish	Event	Year	Place
Bronze	Wheelchair curling	2006	Turin, Italy
Bronze	Wheelchair curling	2010	Vancouver, Canada
Wheelchair curling World Championships
Finish	Event	Year	Place
4.	Wheelchair curling	2002	Sursee, Switzerland
7.	Wheelchair curling	2004	Sursee, Switzerland
4.	Wheelchair curling	2005	Glasgow, Scotland
6.	Wheelchair curling	2008	Sursee, Switzerland
Silver	Wheelchair curling	2009	Vancouver, Canada
6.	Wheelchair curling	2012	Chuncheon, South Korea
Silver	Wheelchair curling	2013	Sochi, Russia
