= Finnish Wheelchair Mixed Doubles Curling Championship =

The Finnish Wheelchair Mixed Doubles Curling Championship (Finnish: Pyörätuoliparicurlingin SM-kilpailu) is the national championship of wheelchair mixed doubles curling in Finland. It has been held annually since season 2020–2021, organized by Finnish Curling Association (Finnish: Suomen Curlingliitto).

== List of champions and medallists ==
Teams line-up in order: man, woman, coach.

| Year (season) | Champion | Runner-up | Bronze | Finish at Worlds |
|---|---|---|---|---|
| 2020-2021 | Markku Karjalainen / Sari Karjalainen, coach: Sari Karjalainen | Juha Rajala / Riitta Särösalo, coach: Juha Rajala | Teemu Klasila / Mina Mojtahedi, coach: Iikko Säntti | Not held |
| 2021-2022 | Markku Karjalainen / Sari Karjalainen | Teemu Klasila / Tiia Tallgren, coach: Juha Rajala | Harri Tuomaala / Ritva Lampinen | 16 |
| 2022-2023 | Markku Karjalainen / Sari Karjalainen | Juha Rajala / Valeriina Silas | Harri Tuomaala / Ritva Lampinen | 19 |
| 2023-2024 | Harri Tuomaala / Ritva Lampinen | Teemu Klasila / Riitta Särösalo | Pekka Pälsynaho / Valeriina Silas | 11 |
| 2024-2025 | Harri Tuomaala / Ritva Lampinen | Valeriina Silas / Juha Rajala | Tiia Tallgren / Yrjö Jääskeläinen | 17 |
| 2025-2026 | Valeriina Silas / Juha Rajala | Tiina Pajunoja / Teemu Klasila | Tiia Tallgren / Yrjö Jääskeläinen | ... |

== Medal record for curlers ==
| Curler | Gold | Silver | Bronze |
|---|---|---|---|
| Markku Karjalainen | 3 | | |
| Sari Karjalainen | 3 | | |
| Ritva Lampinen | 2 | | 2 |
| Harri Tuomaala | 2 | | 2 |
| Juha Rajala | 1 | 3 | |
| Valeriina Silas | 1 | 2 | 1 |
| Teemu Klasila | | 3 | 1 |
| Riitta Särösalo | | 2 | |
| Tiia Tallgren | | 1 | 2 |
| Tiina Pajunoja | | 1 | |
| Yrjö Jääskeläinen | | | 2 |
| Mina Mojtahedi | | | 1 |
| Pekka Pälsynaho | | | 1 |

== See also ==
- Finnish Men's Curling Championship
- Finnish Women's Curling Championship
- Finnish Mixed Curling Championship
- Finnish Mixed Doubles Curling Championship
- Finnish Junior Curling Championships
- Finnish Wheelchair Curling Championship
