= Vesa (name) =

Vesa is a unisex given name. It is used as a masculine given name and a surname in Finland. Notable people with the name are as follows:

== Given name ==
=== Male ===
- Vesa Hanski (born 1973), Finnish swimmer
- Vesa Heikinheimo (born 1983), Finnish football player
- Vesa Hellman (born 1970), Finnish wheelchair curler
- Vesa Jokinen (born 1970), Finnish singer
- Vesa Kanniainen (born 1948), Finnish academic
- Vesa Kokko (born 1964), Finnish wheelchair curler and curling coach
- Vesa Koskela (born 1960), Swedish boxer
- Vesa Lahtinen (born 1968), Finnish ice hockey player
- Vesa Leppänen (born 1951), Finnish wheelchair curler
- Vesa Mäkäläinen (born 1986), Finnish basketball player
- Vesa Mäkipää, Finnish ski-orienteering competitor
- Vesa-Matti Loiri (1945–2022), Finnish actor and musician
- Vesa Pulliainen (1957–2010), Finnish football player
- Vesa Ranta (born 1973), Finnish drummer
- Vesa Rantanen (born 1975), Finnish pole vaulter
- Vesa Rosendahl (born 1975), Finnish speed skater
- Vesa Tauriainen (born 1967), Finnish football player
- Vesa Toskala (born 1977), Finnish ice hockey player
- Vesa Törnroos (1982–2020), Finnish sports shooter
- Ville-Vesa Vainiola (born 1985), Finnish ice hockey player
- Vesa Välimäki (born 1968), Finnish academic
- Vesa Vasara (born 1976), Finnish football player and manager
- Vesa Vierikko (born 1956), Finnish actor
- Vesa Viitakoski (born 1971), Finnish ice hockey player
- Vesa Ylinen (born 1965), Finnish motorcycle rider

=== Female ===
- Vesa Luma (born 1986), Kosovo-Albanian singer and songwriter

== Surname ==
- August Vesa (1878–1918), Finnish journalist and politician
- Emilia Vesa (born 2001), Finnish ice hockey player
- Yrjö Vesa (1898–1967), Finnish engineer and businessman
