= 2016 World Wheelchair-B Curling Championship =

- Host city: Lohja, Finland
- Arena: Kisakallio Sports Institute
- Dates: November 4–11, 2016
- Winner: Finland
- Skip: Markku Karjalainen
- Third: Yrjo Jaaskelainen
- Second: Sari Karjalainen
- Lead: Vesa Leppanen
- Alternate: Riitta Särösalo
- Coach: Vesa Kokko
- Finalist: Scotland (Aileen Neilson)

The 2016 World Wheelchair-B Curling Championship was held from November 4 to 11, 2016 at the Kisakallio Sports Institute in Lohja, Finland.

The qualification event is open to any World Curling Federation member nation not already qualified for the 2017 World Wheelchair Curling Championship.

The event's two top teams, Finland and Scotland, join the host and the top seven finishers from the last World Wheelchair Curling Championship at this season's event in Gangneung, South Korea.

== Teams ==
Country	Skip	Third	Second	Lead	Alternate	Coach
Chinese Taipei	Yi-Wei Ye	Ming-Kang Lee	Kuei-Yi Cheng	Yu-Tzu Chen	Hung-Chu Chen	Yao-Hui Chiang, Yeh-Der Lin
Czech Republic	Radek Musílek	Stepan Benes	Martin Tluk	Jana Břinčilová	Žaneta Schmuttermeierová	Katerina Urbanova
Denmark	Kenneth Ørbæk	Helle Christiansen	Carsten Hansen	Jack Brendle	Tove Hoey	Jorgen Hoj
England	Edward Bidgood (fourth)	Gary Logan	Stephen McGarry	Rosemary Lenton (skip)		Joan Reed
Estonia	Viljar Villiste	Andrei Koitmae	Lauri Murasov	Signe Falkenberg	Mait Matas	Erkki Lill, Osku Kuutamo
Finland	Markku Karjalainen	Yrjo Jaaskelainen	Sari Karjalainen	Vesa Leppanen	Riitta Särösalo	Vesa Kokko
Israel	Oren Iluz	Oshri Abuksis	Shimon Shalom	Adriana Tal Pearl		Sharon Cohen
Italy	Andrea Tabanelli	Egidio Marchese	Emanuele Spelorzi	Rita Dal Monte	Giovanni Fabrizio Ferrero	Roberto Maino
Japan	Takashi Sakataya	Kazuhiro Kashiwabara	Tsutomu Iwata	Kana Matsuda	Reiko Abe	Tsutomu Kobayashi
Latvia	Polina Rozkova (fourth)	Ojars Briedis (skip)	Ilmars Nicmanis	Sergeys Djacenko	Agris Lasmans	Peteris Sveisbergs
Poland	Maciej Karas	Jaroslaw Gosz	Boguslaw Sondej	Agnieszka Kachel	Agata Szymborska	Agnieszka Schroeder, Krzysztof Balcerzak
Scotland	Aileen Neilson	Gregor Ewan	Hugh Nibloe	Robert McPherson	Angie Malone	Sheila Swan
Slovakia	Radoslav Duris	Dusan Pitonak	Peter Zaťko	Monika Kunkelova	Imrich Lyocsa	Frantisek Pitonak
Slovenia	Robert Zerovnik (fourth)	Ziga Bajde (skip)	Joze Klemen	Ziva Hribar		Gregor Verbinc
Sweden	Patrik Kallin	Viljo Petersson-Dahl	Ronny Persson	Kristina Ulander	Zandra Reppe	Mia Boman
Turkey	Mesut Gules	Zuleyha Bingol	Kenan Coskun	Turan Akalin	Serpil Arslan	Gokce Ulugay

== Round robin standings ==
Key
Teams to Playoffs
Teams to Tiebreaker

	Group A	Skip	A1	A2	A3	A4	A5	A6	A7	A8	W	L
A1	Scotland	Aileen Neilson	*	13:1	2:6	7:3	10:7	11:1	7:2	14:1	6	1
A2	Slovakia	Radoslav Ďuriš	1:13	*	9:2	8:4	9:0	12:0	5:4	11:0	6	1
A3	England	Rosemary Lenton	6:2	2:9	*	3:8	11:3	14:1	8:6	18:0	5	2
A4	Sweden	Patrik Kallin	3:7	4:8	8:3	*	8:2	13:0	8:2	9:2	5	2
A5	Slovenia	Ziga Bajde	7:10	0:9	3:11	2:8	*	8:5	10:5	11:3	3	4
A6	Turkey	Mesut Gules	1:11	0:12	1:14	0:13	5:8	*	10:4	9:1	2	5
A7	Italy	Andrea Tabanelli	2:7	4:5	6:8	2:8	5:10	4:10	*	14:2	1	6
A8	Israel	Oren Iluz	1:14	0:11	0:18	2:9	3:11	1:9	2:14	*	0	7

	Group B	Skip	B1	B2	B3	B4	B5	B6	B7	B8	W	L
B1	Finland	Markku Karjalainen	*	9:2	5:6	7:1	7:1	12:6	8:5	14:1	6	1
B2	Poland	Maciej Karas	2:9	*	7:4	7:6	11:3	8:2	1:10	16:0	5	2
B3	Estonia	Viljar Villiste	6:5	4:7	*	6:9	9:6	6:7	9:7	17:4	4	3
B4	Japan	Takashi Sakataya	1:7	6:7	9:6	*	5:10	9:2	12:0	20:1	4	3
B5	Czech Republic	Radek Musílek	1:7	3:11	6:9	10:5	*	6:5	11:5	13:0	4	3
B6	Latvia	Ojars Briedis	6:12	2:8	7:6	2:9	5:6	*	11:1	13:0	3	4
B7	Denmark	Kenneth Ørbæk	5:8	10:1	7:9	0:12	5:11	1:11	*	13:0	2	5
B8	Chinese Taipei	Yi-Wei Ye	1:14	0:16	4:17	1:20	0:13	0:13	0:13	*	0	7

== Tiebreaker ==
Wednesday, November 9, 14:00

Sheet B	1	2	3	4	5	6	7	8	EE	Final
Japan (Sakataya) 🔨	1	3	0	0	2	2	0	0	0	8
Estonia (Villiste)	0	0	4	1	0	0	2	1	2	10

Sheet C	1	2	3	4	5	6	7	8	Final
England (Lenton)	1	0	2	2	1	2	0	X	8
Sweden (Kallin) 🔨	0	2	0	0	0	0	1	X	3

== Playoffs ==
Qualification games
B2	Poland	2
A3	England	5
A2	Slovakia	6
B3	Estonia	2

Semifinals
A1	Scotland	13
A3	England	3
B1	Finland	8
A2	Slovakia	2

Finals
A1	Scotland	4
B1	Finland	6
Third place
A3	England	1
A2	Slovakia	9

=== Qualification games ===
Wednesday, November 9, 18:30

Sheet A	1	2	3	4	5	6	7	8	Final
Estonia (Villiste) 🔨	0	1	0	0	1	0	0	X	2
Slovakia (Ďuriš)	1	0	1	2	0	1	1	X	6

Sheet D	1	2	3	4	5	6	7	8	Final
England (Lenton) 🔨	1	1	0	1	1	1	0	X	5
Poland (Karas)	0	0	1	0	0	0	1	X	2

=== Semifinals ===
Thursday, November 10, 9:30

Sheet B	1	2	3	4	5	6	7	8	Final
Slovakia (Ďuriš) 🔨	0	0	2	0	0	0	0	X	2
Finland (Karjalainen)	1	2	0	0	1	2	2	X	8

Sheet C	1	2	3	4	5	6	7	8	Final
Scotland (Neilson)	0	4	0	3	4	2	X	X	13
England (Lenton) 🔨	2	0	1	0	0	0	X	X	3

=== Bronze medal game ===
Thursday, November 10, 14:30

Sheet A	1	2	3	4	5	6	7	8	Final
England (Lenton)	0	0	0	0	0	1	0	X	1
Slovakia (Ďuriš) 🔨	2	2	1	1	2	0	1	X	9

=== Final ===
Thursday, November 10, 14:30

Sheet B	1	2	3	4	5	6	7	8	Final
Finland (Karjalainen)	0	0	2	0	2	0	1	1	6
Scotland (Neilson) 🔨	1	1	0	1	0	1	0	0	4

== Final standings ==
Place	Team	Skip	Games	Wins	Losses
1st place, gold medalist(s)	Finland	Markku Karjalainen	9	8	1
2nd place, silver medalist(s)	Scotland	Aileen Neilson	9	7	2
3rd place, bronze medalist(s)	Slovakia	Radoslav Ďuriš	10	8	2
4	England	Rosemary Lenton	11	7	4
5	Poland	Maciej Karas	8	5	3
5	Estonia	Viljar Villiste	9	5	4
7	Sweden	Patrik Kallin	8	5	3
8	Japan	Takashi Sakataya	8	4	4
9	Slovenia	Ziga Bajde	7	3	4
10	Czech Republic	Radek Musílek	7	4	3
11	Latvia	Ojars Briedis	7	3	4
12	Turkey	Mesut Gules	7	2	5
13	Denmark	Kenneth Ørbæk	7	2	5
14	Italy	Andrea Tabanelli	7	1	6
15	Israel	Oren Iluz	7	0	7
16	Chinese Taipei	Yi-Wei Ye	7	0	7
