= 2013 World Wheelchair Curling Championship – Qualification Event =

2013 World Wheelchair Curling Championship Qualification Event
- Host city: Lohja, Finland
- Arena: Kisakallio Sports Institute
- Dates: November 3–8, 2012
- Winner: Norway
- Skip: Rune Lorentsen
- Third: Jostein Stordahl
- Second: Sissel Løchen
- Lead: Terje Rafdal
- Alternate: Per Fagerhøi
- Coach: Per Andreassen
- Finalist: Finland (Vesa Hellman)

The qualification event of the 2013 World Wheelchair Curling Championship was held from November 3 to 8, 2012 at the Kisakallio Sports Institute in Lohja, Finland, which hosted the qualification tournaments for the past two World Wheelchair Curling Championships. The qualification event was open to any World Curling Federation affiliated national team not already qualified. The event's two top finishers, Norway and Finland, will join the top 8 finishers from the last World Wheelchair Curling Championship at this season's event in Sochi, Russia.

Of the 11 teams that competed, Italy and Norway last competed at the Worlds in 2012, Germany and the Czech Republic in 2011, Switzerland in 2009, Japan in 2008, Denmark in 2007, and Poland in 2005. Finland, Latvia and Turkey never appeared at a World Wheelchair Curling Championship prior to this season, and Turkey made its debut on the world wheelchair curling stage at the qualification event.

After the round robin, Finland, Norway, Italy, and Latvia advanced to the playoffs, where Finland played Norway for a spot in the World Championships and Italy played Latvia for a spot in the second qualifier. Norway, skipped by Rune Lorentsen, defeated Finland, skipped by Vesa Hellman, with a score of 8–3 to grab the first of two open spots in the World Championships. Finland was relegated to the second qualifier, while Italy, skipped by Paolo Ioriatti, defeated Latvia, skipped by Ojārs Briedis, with a score of 7–4 to advance to the second qualifier. In the Second Place Game, Finland defeated Italy with a score of 9–7 to claim the second spot in the World Championships.

== Teams ==
The teams are listed as follows:

Czech Republic	Denmark	Finland	Germany
Skip: Radek Musílek Third: Martin Tluk; Second: Stepan Benes; Lead: Michaeola Charvátocá; Alternate: Jana Břinčilová; Coach: Kateřina Urbanová	Fourth: Kenneth Ørbæk Skip: Preben Nielsen; Second: Rosita Jensen; Lead: Henrik Harlev Petersen; Alternates: Thomas Pedersen, Kasper Poulsen; Coach: Per Christensen	Fourth: Markku Karjalainen Skip: Vesa Hellman; Second: Sari Karjalainen; Lead: Tuomo Aarnikka; Coach: Lauri Ikävalko	Skip: Jens Jäger Third: Caren Totzauer; Second: Martin Schlitt; Lead: Uwe Raschke; Alternate: Christiane Steger; Coach: Bernd Weißer
Italy	Japan	Latvia	Norway
Skip: Paolo Ioriatti Third: Gabriele Dallapiccola; Second: Sergio Deflorian; Lead: Lucrezia Celentano; Alternate: Rosanna Menazzi; Coach: Giulio Regli	Skip: Shiuchi Iijima Third: Hiroshi Wachi; Second: Sadao Ogawa; Lead: Ayako Saitoh; Alternate: Aki Ogawa; Coach: Michiaki Saitoh	Skip: Ojārs Briedis Third: Poļina Rožkova; Second: Ilmārs Nicmanis; Lead: Aleksandrs Dimbovskis; Alternate: Vita Miezite; Coach: Artis Zentelis	Skip: Rune Lorentsen Third: Jostein Stordahl; Second: Sissel Løchen; Lead: Terje Rafdal; Alternate: Per Fagerhøi; Coach: Per Andreassen
Poland	Switzerland	Turkey	
Skip: Eugeniusz Błaszczak Third: Jarosław Gosz; Second: Maciej Karaś; Lead: Agnieszka Kachel; Alternate: Jacek Wodzyński; Coach: Krzysztof Balcerzak	Skip: Felix Wagner Third: Claudia Hüttenmoser; Second: Eric Décorvet; Lead: Anton Kehrli; Alternate: Mireille Gauthey; Coach: Stephan Pfister	Skip: Turan Akalın Third: Engin Kurt; Second: Savaş Şimşek; Lead: Birsen Sapmaz; Alternate: Berk Kamanli; Coach: Gökçe Ulugay	

== Round-robin standings ==
Final round-robin standings

Country	Skip	W	L
Finland	Vesa Hellman	9	1
Italy	Paolo Ioriatti	7	3
Latvia	Ojārs Briedis	7	3
Norway	Rune Lorentsen	7	3
Czech Republic	Radek Musílek	6	4
Germany	Jens Jäger	6	4
Switzerland	Felix Wagner	5	5
Japan	Shiuchi Iijima	4	6
Denmark	Preben Nielsen	2	8
Poland	Eugeniusz Błaszczak	1	9
Turkey	Turan Akalın	1	9

== Round-robin results ==
All draw times listed in Eastern European Time (UTC+2).

=== Draw 1 ===
Saturday, November 3, 16:00

Sheet A	1	2	3	4	5	6	7	8	Final
Czech Republic (Musílek)	0	0	0	0	3	3	1	1	8
Japan (Iijima) 🔨	2	2	1	1	0	0	0	0	6

Sheet B	1	2	3	4	5	6	7	8	Final
Switzerland (Wagner) 🔨	0	0	0	1	2	0	1	0	4
Latvia (Briedis)	1	1	1	0	0	1	0	2	6

Sheet C	1	2	3	4	5	6	7	8	Final
Finland (Hellman)	1	1	2	2	1	4	0	X	11
Turkey (Akalın) 🔨	0	0	0	0	0	0	1	X	1

Sheet D	1	2	3	4	5	6	7	8	Final
Denmark (Nielsen)	1	0	1	0	0	3	0	0	5
Norway (Lorentsen) 🔨	0	2	0	4	2	0	2	2	12

Sheet E	1	2	3	4	5	6	7	8	Final
Germany (Jäger)	2	1	0	3	1	0	0	0	7
Italy (Ioriatti) 🔨	0	0	3	0	0	5	1	2	11

=== Draw 2 ===
Sunday, November 4, 9:30

Sheet A	1	2	3	4	5	6	7	8	Final
Poland (Błasczcak) 🔨	0	2	1	0	2	0	2	0	7
Finland (Hellman)	2	0	0	4	0	1	0	2	9

Sheet B	1	2	3	4	5	6	7	8	EE	Final
Germany (Jäger)	0	1	0	2	1	1	0	0	0	5
Japan (Iijima) 🔨	1	0	2	0	0	0	1	1	1	6

Sheet C	1	2	3	4	5	6	7	8	Final
Norway (Lorentsen) 🔨	2	1	0	1	0	2	2	0	8
Czech Republic (Musílek)	0	0	2	0	2	0	0	1	5

Sheet D	1	2	3	4	5	6	7	8	Final
Turkey (Akalın)	0	0	0	0	0	0	X	X	0
Italy (Ioriatti) 🔨	1	1	0	5	2	3	X	X	12

Sheet E	1	2	3	4	5	6	7	8	Final
Denmark (Nielsen)	0	1	1	0	0	1	0	2	5
Switzerland (Wagner) 🔨	1	0	0	3	1	0	1	0	6

=== Draw 3 ===
Sunday, November 4, 14:00

Sheet A	1	2	3	4	5	6	7	8	Final
Latvia (Briedis)	1	0	1	0	1	0	1	2	6
Norway (Lorentsen) 🔨	0	1	0	2	0	2	0	0	5

Sheet B	1	2	3	4	5	6	7	8	Final
Czech Republic (Musílek) 🔨	0	0	2	2	0	3	0	4	11
Denmark (Nielsen)	2	1	0	0	1	0	2	0	6

Sheet C	1	2	3	4	5	6	7	8	Final
Poland (Błasczcak) 🔨	0	0	2	1	1	0	0	X	4
Switzerland (Wagner)	3	4	0	0	0	3	1	X	11

Sheet D	1	2	3	4	5	6	7	8	Final
Germany (Jäger)	0	0	0	1	1	0	3	0	5
Finland (Hellman) 🔨	1	0	1	0	0	3	0	1	6

Sheet E	1	2	3	4	5	6	7	8	Final
Japan (Iijima) 🔨	3	2	1	1	0	3	1	X	11
Turkey (Akalın)	0	0	0	0	1	0	0	X	1

=== Draw 4 ===
Sunday, November 4, 18:30

Sheet A	1	2	3	4	5	6	7	8	Final
Denmark (Nielsen) 🔨	0	0	0	0	0	0	X	X	0
Germany (Jäger)	3	1	2	1	1	1	X	X	9

Sheet B	1	2	3	4	5	6	7	8	Final
Norway (Lorentsen) 🔨	3	3	2	0	2	2	1	X	13
Turkey (Akalın)	0	0	0	2	0	0	0	X	2

Sheet C	1	2	3	4	5	6	7	8	Final
Italy (Ioriatti)	1	0	0	4	1	0	1	X	7
Latvia (Briedis) 🔨	0	0	1	0	0	1	0	X	2

Sheet D	1	2	3	4	5	6	7	8	Final
Switzerland (Wagner)	1	3	0	0	1	0	0	0	5
Japan (Iijima) 🔨	0	0	2	2	0	1	2	1	8

Sheet E	1	2	3	4	5	6	7	8	Final
Czech Republic (Musílek)	0	0	1	0	0	4	3	X	8
Poland (Błasczcak) 🔨	1	2	0	1	1	0	0	X	5

=== Draw 5 ===
Monday, November 5, 10:30

Sheet A	1	2	3	4	5	6	7	8	Final
Switzerland (Wagner)	0	2	3	3	1	1	0	X	10
Turkey (Akalın) 🔨	2	0	0	0	0	0	0	X	2

Sheet B	1	2	3	4	5	6	7	8	Final
Poland (Błasczcak) 🔨	1	0	1	0	1	0	0	X	3
Italy (Ioriatti)	0	1	0	1	0	3	2	X	7

Sheet C	1	2	3	4	5	6	7	8	Final
Denmark (Nielsen)	2	0	1	0	0	0	1	X	4
Japan (Iijima) 🔨	0	3	0	5	1	1	0	X	10

Sheet D	1	2	3	4	5	6	7	8	Final
Latvia (Briedis) 🔨	0	1	1	0	1	1	1	0	5
Czech Republic (Musílek)	1	0	0	1	0	0	0	1	3

Sheet E	1	2	3	4	5	6	7	8	Final
Norway (Lorentsen)	0	1	4	3	0	0	1	X	9
Finland (Hellman) 🔨	1	0	0	0	1	2	0	X	4

=== Draw 6 ===
Monday, November 5, 16:30

Sheet A	1	2	3	4	5	6	7	8	EE	Final
Japan (Iijima) 🔨	1	2	0	0	0	1	1	0	0	5
Italy (Ioriatti)	0	0	1	2	1	0	0	1	2	7

Sheet B	1	2	3	4	5	6	7	8	EE	Final
Finland (Hellman) 🔨	0	1	0	0	3	0	0	1	2	7
Switzerland (Wagner)	1	0	1	0	0	2	1	0	0	5

Sheet C	1	2	3	4	5	6	7	8	Final
Germany (Jäger)	0	0	3	0	2	1	1	X	7
Norway (Lorentsen) 🔨	1	1	0	1	0	0	0	X	3

Sheet D	1	2	3	4	5	6	7	8	Final
Poland (Błasczcak)	1	3	1	0	0	0	0	0	5
Turkey (Akalın) 🔨	0	0	0	1	2	1	2	1	7

Sheet E	1	2	3	4	5	6	7	8	Final
Latvia (Briedis) 🔨	1	0	1	1	1	0	0	1	5
Denmark (Nielsen)	0	2	0	0	0	1	1	0	4

=== Draw 7 ===
Tuesday, November 6, 9:30

Sheet A	1	2	3	4	5	6	7	8	Final
Finland (Hellman)	1	0	2	1	1	1	0	2	8
Czech Republic (Musílek) 🔨	0	2	0	0	0	0	1	0	3

Sheet B	1	2	3	4	5	6	7	8	Final
Japan (Iijima) 🔨	0	0	1	1	0	2	0	X	4
Norway (Lorentsen)	2	1	0	0	2	0	2	X	7

Sheet C	1	2	3	4	5	6	7	8	Final
Latvia (Briedis) 🔨	1	1	1	0	0	4	0	0	7
Poland (Błasczcak)	0	0	0	1	1	0	2	1	5

Sheet D	1	2	3	4	5	6	7	8	EE	Final
Italy (Ioriatti)	0	2	0	0	1	0	1	1	0	5
Switzerland (Wagner) 🔨	1	0	1	1	0	2	0	0	1	6

Sheet E	1	2	3	4	5	6	7	8	Final
Turkey (Akalın)	0	0	0	0	0	1	X	X	1
Germany (Jäger) 🔨	4	2	2	2	3	0	X	X	13

=== Draw 8 ===
Tuesday, November 6, 14:00

Sheet A	1	2	3	4	5	6	7	8	Final
Norway (Lorentsen) 🔨	0	0	0	0	0	1	0	X	1
Switzerland (Wagner)	0	2	1	1	5	0	2	X	11

Sheet B	1	2	3	4	5	6	7	8	Final
Latvia (Briedis) 🔨	1	1	0	0	0	0	1	0	3
Germany (Jäger)	0	0	0	1	1	1	0	1	4

Sheet C	1	2	3	4	5	6	7	8	Final
Czech Republic (Musílek) 🔨	2	0	0	4	0	0	1	0	7
Italy (Ioriatti)	0	4	1	0	2	3	0	0	10

Sheet D	1	2	3	4	5	6	7	8	Final
Finland (Hellman) 🔨	2	1	1	3	0	2	2	X	11
Denmark (Nielsen)	0	0	0	0	1	0	0	X	1

Sheet E	1	2	3	4	5	6	7	8	Final
Poland (Błasczcak)	1	0	0	4	0	0	2	1	8
Japan (Iijima) 🔨	0	1	2	0	1	1	0	0	5

=== Draw 9 ===
Tuesday, November 6, 18:30

Sheet A	1	2	3	4	5	6	7	8	Final
Italy (Ioriatti) 🔨	0	3	0	1	2	2	0	X	9
Denmark (Nielsen)	1	0	2	0	0	0	0	X	3

Sheet B	1	2	3	4	5	6	7	8	Final
Turkey (Akalın)	0	1	0	1	0	0	1	X	3
Czech Republic (Musílek) 🔨	3	0	4	0	4	2	0	X	13

Sheet C	1	2	3	4	5	6	7	8	Final
Switzerland (Wagner)	0	0	0	2	1	0	0	1	4
Germany (Jäger) 🔨	0	2	1	0	0	1	2	0	6

Sheet D	1	2	3	4	5	6	7	8	Final
Norway (Lorentsen) 🔨	1	0	2	0	2	0	0	2	7
Poland (Błasczcak)	0	1	0	1	0	1	2	0	5

Sheet E	1	2	3	4	5	6	7	8	Final
Finland (Hellman) 🔨	1	2	0	1	2	1	1	0	8
Latvia (Briedis)	0	0	5	0	0	0	0	2	7

=== Draw 10 ===
Wednesday, November 7, 9:30

Sheet A	1	2	3	4	5	6	7	8	Final
Germany (Jäger) 🔨	0	1	0	1	1	0	1	1	5
Poland (Błasczcak)	2	0	1	0	0	1	0	0	4

Sheet B	1	2	3	4	5	6	7	8	EE	Final
Italy (Ioriatti)	0	2	0	3	0	0	1	1	0	7
Finland (Hellman) 🔨	1	0	1	0	3	2	0	0	1	8

Sheet C	1	2	3	4	5	6	7	8	Final
Turkey (Akalın) 🔨	1	0	0	0	1	0	3	0	5
Denmark (Nielsen)	0	2	2	3	0	2	0	4	13

Sheet D	1	2	3	4	5	6	7	8	Final
Japan (Iijima) 🔨	1	0	3	1	0	0	3	0	8
Latvia (Briedis)	0	1	0	0	4	3	0	2	10

Sheet E	1	2	3	4	5	6	7	8	Final
Switzerland (Wagner)	0	0	0	1	0	2	0	1	4
Czech Republic (Musílek) 🔨	1	1	2	0	2	0	2	0	8

=== Draw 11 ===
Wednesday, November 7, 14:00

Sheet A	1	2	3	4	5	6	7	8	Final
Turkey (Akalın)	1	0	0	0	1	0	X	X	2
Latvia (Briedis) 🔨	0	4	2	1	0	3	X	X	10

Sheet B	1	2	3	4	5	6	7	8	Final
Denmark (Nielsen) 🔨	1	0	2	2	0	1	1	X	7
Poland (Błaszczak)	0	1	0	0	1	0	0	X	2

Sheet C	1	2	3	4	5	6	7	8	Final
Japan (Iijima)	0	0	1	0	1	0	0	X	2
Finland (Hellman) 🔨	1	1	0	3	0	1	1	X	7

Sheet D	1	2	3	4	5	6	7	8	Final
Czech Republic (Musílek) 🔨	0	0	0	2	3	2	4	X	11
Germany (Jäger)	2	2	1	0	0	0	0	X	5

Sheet E	1	2	3	4	5	6	7	8	Final
Italy (Ioriatti)	0	1	0	0	0	2	1	X	4
Norway (Lorentsen) 🔨	2	0	2	2	2	0	0	X	8

== Playoffs ==
Second Place Game
1	Finland	9
3	Italy	7

Semifinals
1	Finland	3
2	Norway	8
3	Italy	7
4	Latvia	4

=== 1 vs. 2 ===
Thursday, November 8, 12:00

Sheet A	1	2	3	4	5	6	7	8	Final
Finland (Hellman) 🔨	0	0	0	1	1	0	1	X	3
Norway (Lorentsen)	2	1	2	0	0	3	0	X	8

Norway is qualified to participate in the Worlds
Finland moves to Second Place Game

=== 3 vs. 4 ===
Thursday, November 8, 12:00

Sheet B	1	2	3	4	5	6	7	8	Final
Italy (Ioriatti)	0	0	2	1	1	0	1	2	7
Latvia (Briedis) 🔨	1	2	0	0	0	1	0	0	4

Italy advances to Second Place Game

=== Second Place Game ===
Thursday, November 8, 16:30

Sheet A	1	2	3	4	5	6	7	8	Final
Finland (Hellman) 🔨	2	0	1	1	0	3	0	2	9
Italy (Ioriatti)	0	2	0	0	3	0	2	0	7

Finland qualified to participate in the Worlds
