= Rikke Iversen (curler) =

Norwegian wheelchair curler

- Curler
- Born: August 11, 1998 (age 28); Oslo, Norway

Team
- Curling club: Halden Curling Club, Halden
- Mixed doubles partner: Rune Lorentsen

Curling career
- Member Association: Norway
- World Wheelchair Championship: 3 (2017, 2019, 2020)
- Paralympic: 1 (2018)
Medal record
Wheelchair curling
Paralympic Games
| Silver medal – second place | 2018 PyeongChang |
World Wheelchair Championship
| Gold medal – first place | 2017 Gangneung |
World Wheelchair Mixed Doubles Championship
| Bronze medal – third place | 2022 Lohja |

Rikke Iversen (born August 11, 1998 in Oslo) is a Norwegian wheelchair curler.

She participated at the 2018 Winter Paralympics where Norwegian team won a silver medal.

== Teams ==
| Season | Skip | Third | Second | Lead | Alternate | Coach | Events |
|---|---|---|---|---|---|---|---|
| 2016–17 | Rune Lorentsen | Jostein Stordahl | Ole Fredrik Syversen | Sissel Løchen | Rikke Iversen | Peter Dahlman | WWhCC 2017 (gold) |
| 2017–18 | Rune Lorentsen | Jostein Stordahl | Ole Fredrik Syversen | Sissel Løchen | Rikke Iversen | Peter Dahlman | PWG 2018 (silver) |
| 2018–19 | Rune Lorentsen | Jostein Stordahl | Ole Fredrik Syversen | Sissel Løchen | Rikke Iversen | Peter Dahlman | WWhCC 2019 (4th) |
| 2019–20 | Jostein Stordahl | Ole Fredrik Syversen | Geir Arne Skogstad | Sissel Løchen | Rikke Iversen | Peter Dahlman | WWhCC 2020 (5th) |
