= Riitta Särösalo =

Finnish wheelchair curler and Paralympian

- Curler ♀
- Born: July 22, 1952 (age 74)

Team
- Curling club: Tampereen Curling ry, Tampere, Hyvinkään Curling ry

Curling career
- Member Association: Finland
- Paralympic: 1 (2018)
Medal record
Wheelchair curling
Finnish Wheelchair Championship
Gold medal – first place	2010
Gold medal – first place	2011
Gold medal – first place	2012
Silver medal – second place	2008
Bronze medal – third place	2009

Riitta Särösalo (born July 22, 1952) is a Finnish wheelchair curler.

She participated in the 2018 Winter Paralympics where Finnish team finished on eleventh place.

== Teams ==
=== Wheelchair mixed ===
Season	Skip	Third	Second	Lead	Alternate	Coach	Events
2007–08	Tuomo Aarnikka	Jari Manni	Harri Haapala	Riitta Särösalo	Seppo Pihnala		WWhCQ 2007 (8th)
2007–08	Vesa Kokko	Harri Haapala	Anneli Rämö	Riitta Särösalo			FWhCC 2008 (silver)
2008–09	Vesa Hellman	Tuomo Aarnikka	Jari Manni	Riitta Särösalo	Seppo Pihnala	Lauri Ikävalko	WWhCQ 2008 (7th)
2008–09	Vesa Hellman	Vesa Kokko	Riitta Särösalo	Anneli Rämö			FWhCC 2009 (bronze)
2009–10	Vesa Hellman	Vesa Kokko	Riitta Särösalo				FWhCC 2010 (gold)
2010–11	Vesa Hellman	Tuomo Aarnikka	Markku Karjalainen	Riitta Särösalo	Sari Karjalainen	Lauri Ikävalko	WWhCQ 2010 (8th)
2010–11	Vesa Hellman	Riitta Särösalo	Vesa Kokko	Mikko Nuora			FWhCC 2011 (gold)
2011–12	Markku Karjalainen (fourth)	Vesa Hellman (skip)	Sari Karjalainen	Tuomo Aarnikka	Riitta Särösalo	Lauri Ikävalko	WWhCQ 2011 (bronze)
2011–12	Vesa Hellman	Mikko Nuora	Riitta Särösalo	Vesa Kokko			FWhCC 2012 (gold)
2015–16	Markku Karjalainen	Sari Karjalainen	Yrjö Jääskeläinen	Tuomo Aarnikka	Riitta Särösalo	Lauri Ikävalko	WWhCC 2016 (10th)
2016–17	Markku Karjalainen	Yrjö Jääskeläinen	Sari Karjalainen	Vesa Leppänen	Riitta Särösalo	Vesa Kokko	WWhBCC 2016 (gold); WWhCC 2017 (10th)
2017–18	Markku Karjalainen	Yrjö Jääskeläinen	Vesa Leppänen	Sari Karjalainen	Riitta Särösalo	Vesa Kokko	WPG 2018 (11th)
2018–19	Yrjö Jääskeläinen	Harri Tuomaala	Teemu Klasila	Riitta Särösalo	Pekka Pälsynaho	Vesa Kokko	WWhBCC 2018 (4th)
2019–20	Harri Tuomaala	Juha Rajala	Teemu Klasila	Riitta Särösalo	Pekka Pälsynaho	Vesa Kokko	WWhBCC 2019 (10th)

=== Wheelchair mixed doubles ===
Season	Male	Female	Events
2020–21	Juha Rajala	Riitta Särösalo	FWhMDCC 2021 (silver)
2023–24	Teemu Klasila	Riitta Särösalo	FWhMDCC 2024 (silver)
