= Sari Karjalainen =

Finnish wheelchair curler and Paralympian

- Curler ♀
- Born: Sari Räsänen; 26 June 1968 (age 58); Ylitornio

Team
- Curling club: Lappi Kurlinki Ry, Rovaniemi

Curling career
- Member Association: Finland
- World Wheelchair Championship: 4 (2013, 2015, 2016, 2017)
- Paralympic: 2 (2014, 2018)
Medal record
Wheelchair curling
World Wheelchair Championship
Bronze medal – third place	2015 Lohja
Finnish Wheelchair Championship
Gold medal – first place	2013
Silver medal – second place	2009
Silver medal – second place	2010
Silver medal – second place	2011
Bronze medal – third place	2012

Sari Karjalainen (born 26 June 1968 in Ylitornio as Sari Räsänen) is a Finnish wheelchair curler.

She participated in the 2014 and 2018 Winter Paralympics where Finnish team finished on tenth and eleventh places respectively.

Her husband Markku is also a member of the Finland national wheelchair curling team.

== Teams ==
Season	Skip	Third	Second	Lead	Alternate	Coach	Events
2008–09	Sari Räsänen	Tarja Hänninen	Jorma Lehmus	Markku Karjalainen			FWhCC 2009 (silver)
2009–10	Sari Räsänen	Tarja Hänninen	Vesa Leppänen	Markku Karjalainen			FWhCC 2010 (silver)
2010–11	Vesa Hellman	Tuomo Aarnikka	Markku Karjalainen	Riitta Särösalo	Sari Karjalainen	Lauri Ikävalko	WWhCQ 2010 (8th)
2010–11	Markku Karjalainen	Sari Karjalainen	Vesa Leppänen				FWhCC 2011 (silver)
2011–12	Markku Karjalainen (fourth)	Vesa Hellman (skip)	Sari Karjalainen	Tuomo Aarnikka	Riitta Särösalo	Lauri Ikävalko	WWhCQ 2011 (bronze)
2011–12	Markku Karjalainen	Vesa Leppänen	Sari Karjalainen				FWhCC 2012 (bronze)
2012–13	Markku Karjalainen (fourth)	Vesa Hellman (skip)	Sari Karjalainen	Tuomo Aarnikka		Lauri Ikävalko	WWhCQ 2012 (silver)
2012–13	Vesa Leppänen	Sari Karjalainen	Markku Karjalainen				FWhCC 2013 (gold)
2012–13	Markku Karjalainen (fourth)	Vesa Hellman (skip)	Sari Karjalainen	Tuomo Aarnikka	Mina Mojtahedi	Osku Kuutamo	WWhCC 2013 (8th)
2013–14	Markku Karjalainen	Sari Karjalainen	Vesa Hellman	Tuomo Aarnikka	Mina Mojtahedi	Osku Kuutamo	WPG 2014 (10th)
2014–15	Markku Karjalainen	Sari Karjalainen	Mina Mojtahedi	Tuomo Aarnikka	Vesa Leppänen	Anne Malmi	WWhCC 2015 (bronze)
2015–16	Markku Karjalainen	Sari Karjalainen	Yrjö Jääskeläinen	Tuomo Aarnikka	Riitta Särösalo	Lauri Ikävalko	WWhCC 2016 (10th)
2016–17	Markku Karjalainen	Yrjö Jääskeläinen	Sari Karjalainen	Vesa Leppänen	Riitta Särösalo	Vesa Kokko	WWhBCC 2016 (gold); WWhCC 2017 (10th)
2017–18	Markku Karjalainen	Yrjö Jääskeläinen	Vesa Leppänen	Sari Karjalainen	Riitta Särösalo	Vesa Kokko	WPG 2018 (11th)

=== Mixed doubles ===
Season	Female	Male	Coach	Events
2021–22	Sari Karjalainen	Markku Karjalainen	Juuso Rasanen	WWhMDCC 2022 (...th)
