= 2017 World Wheelchair Curling Championship =

- Host city: Gangneung, South Korea
- Arena: Gangneung Curling Centre
- Dates: March 4–11
- Winner: Norway
- Skip: Rune Lorentsen
- Third: Jostein Stordahl
- Second: Ole Fredrik Syversen
- Lead: Sissel Løchen
- Alternate: Rikke Iversen
- Finalist: Russia (Andrey Smirnov)

The 2017 World Wheelchair Curling Championship was held from March 4 to 11 at the Gangneung Curling Centre in Gangneung, South Korea. Norway won a third title after winning over Russia, who defeated Norway during the 2016 championship final.

== Qualification ==
- South Korea (host country)
- Top seven teams from the 2016 World Wheelchair Curling Championship:
  - Norway
  - Russia
  - Switzerland
  - China
  - United States
  - Canada
  - Germany
- Two teams from the 2016 World Wheelchair Curling B-Championship
  - Finland
  - Scotland
1. Because South Korea, one of the top seven teams in the 2016 world championship, already qualified as the host country, Germany who ranked 8th in the competition additionally qualified.

=== Qualification event ===
Finland and Scotland qualified for the World Championship from the qualifying event held during November 2016 in Lohja, Finland.

== Teams ==
The teams are listed as follows:

Canada	China	Finland	Germany	Norway
Skip: Jim Armstrong; Third: Ina Forrest; Second: Marie Wright; Lead: Mark Ideson; Alternate: Ellis Tull; Coach: Wayne Kiel	Skip: Wang Haitao; Third: Liu Wei; Second: Chen Jianxin; Lead: Xu Guangqin; Alternate: Zhang Mingliang; Coach: Li Jianrui	Skip: Markku Karjalainen; Third: Yrjo Jaaskelainen; Second: Sari Karjalainen; Lead: Vesa Leppanen; Alternate: Riitta Sarosalo; Coach: Vesa Kokko	Skip: Christiane Putzich; Third: Harry Pavel; Second: Martin Schlitt; Lead: Heike Melchior; Alternate: Christoph Gemmer; Coach: Bernd Weisser	Skip: Rune Lorentsen; Third: Jostein Stordahl; Second: Ole Fredrik Syversen; Lead: Sissel Løchen; Alternate: Rikke Iversen; Coach: Peter Dahlman
Russia	Scotland	South Korea	Switzerland	United States
Skip: Andrey Smirnov; Third: Konstantin Kurokhtin; Second: Alexander Shevchenko; Lead: Daria Shchukina; Alternate: Marat Romanov; Coach: Anton Batugin	Skip: Aileen Neilson; Third: Gregor Ewan; Second: Hugh Nibloe; Lead: Robert McPherson; Alternate: Angie Malone; Coach: Sheila Swan	Skip: Kim Jong-pan; Third: Seo Soon-seok; Second: Cha Jae-goan; Lead: Cho Min-kyong; Alternate: Lee Dong-ha; Coach: Beak Jong-chul	Skip: Felix Wagner; Third: Marcel Bodenmann; Second: Claudia Hüttenmoser; Lead: Beatrix Blaül; Alternate: Hans Burgener; Coach: Stephan Pfister	Skip: Stephen Emt; Third: Kirk Black; Second: Jimmy Joseph; Lead: Penny Greely; Alternate: Justin Marshall; Coach: Steve Brown

== Round-robin standings ==
Final round-robin standings

Key
Teams to Playoffs
Teams to Tiebreaker
Teams to Relegation Game
Teams Relegated to 2017 B-Championship

Country	Skip	W	L
Russia	Andrey Smirnov	8	1
Scotland	Aileen Neilson	6	3
China	Wang Haitao	6	3
Norway	Rune Lorentsen	5	4
Canada	Jim Armstrong	5	4
South Korea	Kim Jong-pan	4	5
United States	Stephen Emt	3	6
Switzerland	Felix Wagner	3	6
Germany	Christiane Putzich	3	6
Finland	Markku Karjalainen	2	7

== Round-robin results ==
All draw times are listed in Korean Standard Time (UTC+09).

=== Draw 1 ===
Saturday, March 04, 9:00

Sheet A	1	2	3	4	5	6	7	8	Final
Russia (Smirnov)	0	2	0	2	0	1	0	1	6
Switzerland (Wagner) 🔨	1	0	2	0	1	0	1	0	5

Sheet B	1	2	3	4	5	6	7	8	Final
China (Wang)	0	0	0	0	2	0	0	0	2
Finland (Karjalainen) 🔨	0	1	0	0	0	2	1	1	5

Sheet C	1	2	3	4	5	6	7	8	Final
Norway (Lorentsen) 🔨	2	4	4	3	0	2	0	X	15
Germany (Putzich)	0	0	0	0	2	0	0	X	2

Sheet D	1	2	3	4	5	6	7	8	EE	Final
Canada (Armstrong) 🔨	1	0	1	0	0	0	0	2	1	5
Scotland (Neilson)	0	1	0	1	1	1	0	0	0	4

=== Draw 2 ===
Saturday, March 04, 15:30

Sheet A	1	2	3	4	5	6	7	8	Final
South Korea (Kim)	0	1	1	1	0	0	2	3	8
United States (Emt) 🔨	3	0	0	0	1	0	0	0	4

Sheet B	1	2	3	4	5	6	7	8	Final
Norway (Lorentsen)	0	1	0	1	0	1	0	0	3
Russia (Smirnov) 🔨	1	0	1	0	1	0	2	2	7

Sheet C	1	2	3	4	5	6	7	8	Final
Scotland (Neilson) 🔨	1	0	1	0	1	0	1	1	5
China (Wang)	0	0	0	1	0	2	0	0	3

Sheet D	1	2	3	4	5	6	7	8	Final
Finland (Karjalainen)	0	1	3	0	0	1	0	1	6
Switzerland (Wagner) 🔨	1	0	0	2	1	0	1	0	5

=== Draw 3 ===
Sunday, March 05, 10:00

Sheet A	1	2	3	4	5	6	7	8	Final
Scotland (Neilson) 🔨	1	2	0	0	1	0	2	X	6
Finland (Karjalainen)	0	0	1	1	0	1	0	X	3

Sheet B	1	2	3	4	5	6	7	8	Final
South Korea (Seo) 🔨	1	2	0	0	2	0	0	0	5
Germany (Putzich)	0	0	1	3	0	1	1	1	7

Sheet C	1	2	3	4	5	6	7	8	Final
Switzerland (Wanger) 🔨	1	0	1	0	1	0	0	1	4
Canada (Armstrong)	0	1	0	0	0	1	1	0	3

Sheet D	1	2	3	4	5	6	7	8	Final
United States (Emt)	1	0	2	0	2	0	1	0	6
Russia (Smirnov) 🔨	0	1	0	1	0	1	0	4	7

=== Draw 4 ===
Sunday, March 05, 15:00

Sheet A	1	2	3	4	5	6	7	8	Final
Norway (Lorentsen)	0	1	1	1	0	2	0	1	6
South Korea (Seo) 🔨	1	0	0	0	1	0	3	0	5

Sheet B	1	2	3	4	5	6	7	8	Final
United States (Emt)	1	0	1	0	1	0	1	X	4
Canada (Armstrong) 🔨	0	3	0	2	0	1	0	X	6

Sheet D	1	2	3	4	5	6	7	8	Final
Germany (Putzich) 🔨	1	0	0	1	0	1	0	1	4
China (Wang)	0	1	1	0	1	0	2	0	5

=== Draw 5 ===
Monday, March 06, 10:00

Sheet A	1	2	3	4	5	6	7	8	Final
China (Wang)	0	0	2	0	1	0	0	X	3
Russia (Smirnov) 🔨	1	1	0	1	0	2	2	X	7

Sheet B	1	2	3	4	5	6	7	8	Final
Scotland (Neilson) 🔨	5	1	0	4	3	0	X	X	13
Norway (Lorentsen)	0	0	1	0	0	1	X	X	2

Sheet C	1	2	3	4	5	6	7	8	Final
United States (Emt) 🔨	1	1	2	0	2	0	0	X	6
Finland (Karjalainen)	0	0	0	1	0	2	1	X	4

Sheet D	1	2	3	4	5	6	7	8	Final
Switzerland (Wagner) 🔨	0	1	0	1	0	2	0	X	4
South Korea (Seo)	1	0	1	0	2	0	2	X	6

=== Draw 6 ===
Monday, March 06, 15:00

Sheet A	1	2	3	4	5	6	7	8	Final
Canada (Armstrong) 🔨	0	1	1	1	1	0	3	2	8
Germany (Putzich)	1	0	0	0	0	1	0	0	2

Sheet B	1	2	3	4	5	6	7	8	Final
China (Wang)	2	0	4	1	3	0	X	X	10
Switzerland (Wagner) 🔨	0	1	0	0	0	1	X	X	2

Sheet C	1	2	3	4	5	6	7	8	Final
Russia (Smirnov)	0	3	0	3	0	2	0	0	8
Scotland (Neilson) 🔨	2	0	2	0	1	0	2	0	7

Sheet D	1	2	3	4	5	6	7	8	Final
Norway (Lorentsen) 🔨	2	2	1	1	0	1	1	X	8
Finland (Karjalainen)	0	0	0	0	1	0	0	X	1

=== Draw 7 ===
Tuesday, March 07, 10:00

Sheet B	1	2	3	4	5	6	7	8	Final
Russia (Smirnov)	0	3	1	0	2	0	2	X	8
South Korea (Seo) 🔨	2	0	0	0	0	1	0	X	3

Sheet C	1	2	3	4	5	6	7	8	Final
Germany (Putzich) 🔨	1	0	0	2	0	3	1	X	7
United States (Emt)	0	1	0	0	1	0	0	X	2

Sheet D	1	2	3	4	5	6	7	8	Final
China (Wang)	2	1	0	1	0	1	1	X	6
Canada (Ideson) 🔨	0	0	2	0	0	0	0	X	2

=== Draw 8 ===
Tuesday, March 07, 15:00

Sheet A	1	2	3	4	5	6	7	8	Final
Switzerland (Wagner) 🔨	2	0	2	0	3	0	1	X	8
Norway (Lorentsen)	0	0	0	1	0	1	0	X	2

Sheet B	1	2	3	4	5	6	7	8	Final
Finland (Karjalainen)	0	2	0	1	0	1	1	0	5
Germany (Putzich) 🔨	2	0	2	0	1	0	0	2	7

Sheet C	1	2	3	4	5	6	7	8	Final
South Korea (Cha) 🔨	2	1	2	1	0	0	0	2	8
Canada (Armstrong)	0	0	0	0	2	1	1	0	4

Sheet D	1	2	3	4	5	6	7	8	Final
Scotland (Neilson)	0	0	1	0	0	2	1	0	4
United States (Black) 🔨	1	1	0	0	2	0	0	1	5

=== Draw 9 ===
Wednesday, March 08, 10:00

Sheet A	1	2	3	4	5	6	7	8	Final
Finland (Karjalainen)	1	0	1	0	1	2	1	0	6
Canada (Armstrong) 🔨	0	4	0	1	0	0	0	3	8

Sheet B	1	2	3	4	5	6	7	8	Final
Norway (Lorentsen) 🔨	2	1	0	0	0	1	0	0	4
China (Wang)	0	0	1	1	1	0	1	2	6

Sheet C	1	2	3	4	5	6	7	8	Final
Scotland (Neilson) 🔨	0	1	1	2	3	0	0	X	7
Switzerland (Wagner)	1	0	0	0	0	1	1	X	3

Sheet D	1	2	3	4	5	6	7	8	Final
Russia (Smirnov)	0	3	0	2	2	1	0	1	9
Germany (Putzich) 🔨	1	0	3	0	0	0	2	0	6

=== Draw 10 ===
Wednesday, March 08, 15:00

Sheet A	1	2	3	4	5	6	7	8	Final
South Korea (Cha)	0	0	0	2	0	0	0	X	2
Scotland (Neilson) 🔨	0	2	0	0	2	1	1	X	6

Sheet B	1	2	3	4	5	6	7	8	Final
Switzerland (Wagner)	0	0	0	3	0	0	X	X	3
United States (Black) 🔨	4	1	3	0	1	1	X	X	10

Sheet C	1	2	3	4	5	6	7	8	Final
Finland (Karjalainen)	1	0	1	3	0	0	1	0	6
Russia (Smirnov) 🔨	0	1	0	0	3	1	0	2	7

=== Draw 11 ===
Thursday, March 09, 10:00

Sheet A	1	2	3	4	5	6	7	8	Final
United States (Black) 🔨	2	2	1	0	0	0	0	0	5
China (Wang)	0	0	0	2	1	1	1	3	8

Sheet B	1	2	3	4	5	6	7	8	Final
Germany (Putzich)	0	0	1	0	1	0	1	X	3
Scotland (Neilson) 🔨	1	0	0	1	0	4	0	X	9

Sheet C	1	2	3	4	5	6	7	8	Final
Canada (Armstrong) 🔨	1	0	1	0	0	0	X	X	2
Norway (Lorentsen)	0	2	0	2	4	1	X	X	9

Sheet D	1	2	3	4	5	6	7	8	Final
South Korea (Seo) 🔨	4	1	1	1	0	2	X	X	9
Finland (Karjalainen)	0	0	0	0	1	0	X	X	1

=== Draw 12 ===
Thursday, March 09, 15:00

Sheet A	1	2	3	4	5	6	7	8	Final
Germany (Putzich) 🔨	1	0	0	0	1	0	1	0	3
Switzerland (Wagner)	0	1	1	1	0	2	0	1	6

Sheet B	1	2	3	4	5	6	7	8	Final
Canada (Armstrong)	3	0	2	1	3	0	X	X	9
Russia (Smirnov) 🔨	0	1	0	0	0	1	X	X	2

Sheet C	1	2	3	4	5	6	7	8	Final
China (Wang) 🔨	2	0	1	0	0	0	2	0	5
South Korea (Kim)	0	1	0	1	1	0	0	1	4

Sheet D	1	2	3	4	5	6	7	8	Final
United States (Emt) 🔨	1	0	1	2	0	0	0	X	4
Norway (Stordahl)	0	2	0	0	2	1	1	X	6

=== Tiebreaker ===
Friday, March 10, 10:00

Team	1	2	3	4	5	6	7	8	Final
Norway (Stordahl)	1	1	2	0	0	0	1	0	5
Canada (Armstrong) 🔨	0	0	0	1	1	1	0	1	4

Norway advances to the playoffs

=== Relegation Game ===
Friday, March 10, 10:00

Team	1	2	3	4	5	6	7	8	Final
Switzerland (Wagner) 🔨	0	1	2	3	2	0	3	X	11
Germany (Putzich)	0	0	0	0	0	3	0	X	3

Germany lost the relegation game, but because the host Scotland and additional eight teams who placed second to ninth from this competition were invited to the 2019 World Wheelchair Curling Championship, Germany still qualified for the 2019 championship as the ninth-place team.

== Playoffs ==
Page playoff system
1	Russia	4
2	Scotland	2
3	China	3
4	Norway	6

Semifinal
2	Scotland	3
4	Norway	7

Final
1	Russia	3
4	Norway	8

Bronze Medal Game
2	Scotland	9
3	China	5

=== 1 vs. 2 ===
Friday, March 10, 15:00

Team	1	2	3	4	5	6	7	8	Final
Russia (Smirnov)	1	1	0	0	1	1	0	X	4
Scotland (Neilson) 🔨	0	0	0	1	0	0	1	X	2

=== 3 vs. 4 ===
Friday, March 10, 15:00

Team	1	2	3	4	5	6	7	8	Final
China (Wang) 🔨	0	1	0	1	0	1	0	X	3
Norway (Lorentsen)	1	0	1	0	3	0	1	X	6

=== Semifinal ===
Saturday, March 11, 10:00

Team	1	2	3	4	5	6	7	8	Final
Scotland (Neilson) 🔨	1	0	0	0	1	1	0	0	3
Norway (Lorentsen)	0	1	1	3	0	0	1	1	7

=== Bronze medal game ===
Saturday, March 11, 15:00

Team	1	2	3	4	5	6	7	8	Final
Scotland (Neilson) 🔨	1	0	1	1	1	0	3	2	9
China (Wang)	0	4	0	0	0	1	0	0	5

=== Gold medal game ===
Saturday, March 11, 15:00

Team	1	2	3	4	5	6	7	8	Final
Russia (Smirnov)	0	0	2	0	0	1	0	X	3
Norway (Lorentsen) 🔨	1	0	0	2	3	0	2	X	8

2017 World Wheelchair Curling Championship
(Norway)
Norway
3rd title
