= Peter Dahlman =

Norwegian curler and coach (born 1960)

- Curler ♂
- Born: December 28, 1960 (age 65); Gothenburg, Sweden

Curling career
- Member Association: Norway
Medal record
Curling

Peter Dahlman (born December 28, 1960 in Gothenburg, Sweden) is a Norwegian male curler and coach.

As a coach of Norwegian wheelchair curling team he participated in 2018 Winter Paralympics and 2022 Winter Paralympics.

== Record as a coach of national teams ==
Year	Tournament, event	National team	Place
2015	2015 World Wheelchair-B Curling Championship	Norway (wheelchair)	1st place, gold medalist(s)
2016	2016 World Wheelchair Curling Championship	Norway (wheelchair)	2nd place, silver medalist(s)
2017	2017 World Wheelchair Curling Championship	Norway (wheelchair)	1st place, gold medalist(s)
2018	2018 Winter Paralympics	Norway (wheelchair)	2nd place, silver medalist(s)
2019	2019 World Wheelchair Curling Championship	Norway (wheelchair)	4
2020	2020 World Wheelchair Curling Championship	Norway (wheelchair)	5
2021	2021 World Wheelchair Curling Championship	Norway (wheelchair)	7
2022	2022 Winter Paralympics	Norway (wheelchair)	7
2022	2022 World Wheelchair Mixed Doubles Curling Championship	Norway (wheelchair mixed double)	3rd place, bronze medalist(s)
2023	2023 World Wheelchair Curling Championship	Norway (wheelchair)	7
2024	2024 World Wheelchair Curling Championship	Norway (wheelchair)	1st place, gold medalist(s)
