= Yrjö Jääskeläinen =

Finnish wheelchair curler (born 1956)

- Curler ♂
- Born: December 2, 1956 (age 69)

Team
- Curling club: Curling Club Lahti Ry, Lahti

Curling career
- Member Association: Finland
- World Wheelchair Championship: 2 (2016, 2017)
- Paralympic: 1 (2018)
Medal record
Wheelchair curling
Finnish Wheelchair Championship
Bronze medal – third place	2013

Yrjö Tapani Jääskeläinen (born December 2, 1956) is a Finnish wheelchair curler.

He participated in the 2018 Winter Paralympics where Finnish team finished on eleventh place.

== Teams ==
Season	Skip	Third	Second	Lead	Alternate	Coach	Events
2009–10	Pekka Pälsynaho	Pekka Nieminen	Yrjö Jääskeläinen	Osku Kuutamo		Osku Kuutamo	FWhCC 2010 (4th)
2010–11	Pekka Pälsynaho	Yrjö Jääskeläinen	Pekka Nieminen	Marko Ikävalko			FWhCC 2011 (5th)
2011–12	Pekka Pälsynaho	Pekka Nieminen	Yrjö Jääskeläinen	Marko Ikävalko			FWhCC 2012 (4th)
2012–13	Pekka Nieminen	Pekka Pälsynaho	Yrjö Jääskeläinen				FWhCC 2013 (bronze)
2015–16	Markku Karjalainen	Sari Karjalainen	Yrjö Jääskeläinen	Tuomo Aarnikka	Riitta Särösalo	Lauri Ikävalko	WWhCC 2016 (10th)
2016–17	Markku Karjalainen	Yrjö Jääskeläinen	Sari Karjalainen	Vesa Leppänen	Riitta Särösalo	Vesa Kokko	WWhBCC 2016 (gold); WWhCC 2017 (10th)
2017–18	Markku Karjalainen	Yrjö Jääskeläinen	Vesa Leppänen	Sari Karjalainen	Riitta Särösalo	Vesa Kokko	WPG 2018 (11th)
2018–19	Yrjö Jääskeläinen	Harri Tuomaala	Teemu Klasila	Riitta Särösalo	Pekka Pälsynaho	Vesa Kokko	WWhBCC 2018 (4th)
