= Vesa Hellman =

Finnish male wheelchair curler and Paralympian

- Curler ♂
- Born: November 11, 1970 (age 56); Pertteli

Team
- Curling club: Hyvinkään Curling ry

Curling career
- Member Association: Finland
- World Wheelchair Championship: 1 (2013)
- Paralympic: 1 (2014)
Medal record
Wheelchair curling
Finnish Wheelchair Championship
Gold medal – first place	2010
Gold medal – first place	2011
Gold medal – first place	2012
Silver medal – second place	2013
Bronze medal – third place	2009

Vesa Hellman (born November 11, 1970 in Pertteli) is a Finnish wheelchair curler.

He participated in the 2014 Winter Paralympics where Finnish team finished on tenth place.

== Teams ==
Season	Skip	Third	Second	Lead	Alternate	Coach	Events
2008–09	Vesa Hellman	Tuomo Aarnikka	Jari Manni	Riitta Särösalo	Seppo Pihnala	Lauri Ikävalko	WWhCQ 2008 (7th)
2008–09	Vesa Hellman	Vesa Kokko	Riitta Särösalo	Anneli Rämö			FWhCC 2009 (bronze)
2009–10	Vesa Hellman	Vesa Kokko	Riitta Särösalo				FWhCC 2010 (gold)
2010–11	Vesa Hellman	Tuomo Aarnikka	Markku Karjalainen	Riitta Särösalo	Sari Karjalainen	Lauri Ikävalko	WWhCQ 2010 (8th)
2010–11	Vesa Hellman	Riitta Särösalo	Vesa Kokko	Mikko Nuora			FWhCC 2011 (gold)
2011–12	Markku Karjalainen (fourth)	Vesa Hellman (skip)	Sari Karjalainen	Tuomo Aarnikka	Riitta Särösalo	Lauri Ikävalko	WWhCQ 2011 (bronze)
2011–12	Vesa Hellman	Mikko Nuora	Riitta Särösalo	Vesa Kokko			FWhCC 2012 (gold)
2012–13	Markku Karjalainen (fourth)	Vesa Hellman (skip)	Sari Karjalainen	Tuomo Aarnikka		Lauri Ikävalko	WWhCQ 2012 (silver)
2012–13	Vesa Hellman	Seppo Pihnala	Mina Mojtahedi	Tuomo Aarnikka			FWhCC 2013 (silver)
2012–13	Markku Karjalainen (fourth)	Vesa Hellman (skip)	Sari Karjalainen	Tuomo Aarnikka	Mina Mojtahedi	Osku Kuutamo	WWhCC 2013 (8th)
2013–14	Markku Karjalainen	Sari Karjalainen	Vesa Hellman	Tuomo Aarnikka	Mina Mojtahedi	Osku Kuutamo	WPG 2014 (10th)
