= Finnish Wheelchair Curling Championship =

The Finnish Wheelchair Curling Championship (Finnish: Pyörätuolicurlingin SM-kilpailut) is the national championship of wheelchair curling in Finland. It has been held annually since 2008 to 2013, organized by Finnish Curling Association (Finnish: Suomen Curlingliitto).

== List of champions and medallists ==
Teams line-up in order: skip/fourth, third, second, lead, alternate, coach; skips marked bold.

Year	Champion	Runner-up	Bronze
2008	Panthera Team; Jari Manni, Tuomo Aarnikka, Risto Kuronen, Seppo Pihnala	Team PT-keskus; Vesa Kokko, Harri Haapala, Anneli Rämö, Riitta Särösalo	
2009	Panthera Team; Tuomo Aarnikka, Jari Manni, Risto Kuronen, Seppo Pihnala	Lappi Kurlinki; Sari Räsänen, Tarja Hänninen, Jorma Lehmus, Markku Karjalainen	Osattomat; Vesa Hellman, Vesa Kokko, Riitta Särösalo, Anneli Rämö
2010	OCT; Vesa Hellman, Vesa Kokko, Riitta Särösalo	Lappi Kurlinki; Sari Räsänen, Tarja Hänninen, Vesa Leppänen, Markku Karjalainen	Panthera Team; Tuomo Aarnikka, Risto Kuronen, Reijo Laakso, Jari Manni, alternate: Seppo Pihnala
2011	Osattomat; Vesa Hellman, Riitta Särösalo, Vesa Kokko, Mikko Nuora	Lappi Kurlinki; Markku Karjalainen, Sari Karjalainen, Vesa Leppänen	Sopur team Tuomo Aarnikka, Osku Kuutamo, Jussi Juntunen, Jorma Nieminen
2012	Osattomat; Vesa Hellman, Mikko Nuora, Riitta Särösalo, Vesa Kokko	Panthera Team; Tuomo Aarnikka, Seppo Pihnala, Jussi Juntunen	Lappi Kurlinki; Markku Karjalainen, Vesa Leppänen, Sari Karjalainen
2013	Lappi Kurlinki; Vesa Leppänen, Sari Karjalainen, Markku Karjalainen	Team Panthera; Vesa Hellman, Seppo Pihnala, Mina Mojtahedi, Tuomo Aarnikka	Curling Club Lahti; Pekka Nieminen, Pekka Pälsynaho, Yrjö Jääskeläinen

== See also ==
- Finnish Men's Curling Championship
- Finnish Women's Curling Championship
- Finnish Mixed Curling Championship
- Finnish Mixed Doubles Curling Championship
- Finnish Junior Curling Championships
- Finnish Wheelchair Mixed Doubles Curling Championship
