= Wayne Kiel =

Canadian male curler and coach

- Curler ♂
- Born: December 5, 1949 (age 76)

Curling career
- Member Association: Canada
Medal record
Curling

Wayne "Winger" Kiel (born December 5, 1949) is a Canadian male curler and coach.

As a coach of Canadian wheelchair curling team he participated in 2018 Winter Paralympics.

He started curling in 1960.

He awarded Canadian Curling Association Award of achievement in 1999.

== Record as a coach of national teams ==
Year	Tournament, event	National team	Place
2004	2004 European Curling Championships	Kazakhstan (men)	26
2004	2004 European Curling Championships	Kazakhstan (women)	21
2016	2016 World Wheelchair Curling Championship	Canada (wheelchair)	7
2017	2017 World Wheelchair Curling Championship	Canada (wheelchair)	5
2018	2018 Winter Paralympics	Canada (wheelchair)	3rd place, bronze medalist(s)
2019	2019 World Wheelchair Curling Championship	Canada (wheelchair)	10
2019	2019 World Wheelchair-B Curling Championship	Canada (wheelchair)	1st place, gold medalist(s)
2020	2020 World Wheelchair Curling Championship	Canada (wheelchair)	2nd place, silver medalist(s)
