= Tuomo Aarnikka =

Finnish wheelchair curler

- Curler ♂
- Born: 28 April 1967 (age 59); Lahti

Team
- Curling club: M-Curling / Panthera Team / PT-curling

Curling career
- Member Association: Finland
- World Wheelchair Championship: 4 (2013, 2015, 2016)
- Paralympic: 1 (2014)
Medal record
Wheelchair curling
World Wheelchair Championship
Bronze medal – third place	2015 Lohja
Finnish Wheelchair Championship
Gold medal – first place	2008
Gold medal – first place	2009
Silver medal – second place	2012
Silver medal – second place	2013
Bronze medal – third place	2010
Bronze medal – third place	2011

Tuomo Aarnikka (born 28 April 1967 in Lahti) is a Finnish wheelchair curler.

He participated in the 2014 Winter Paralympics where Finnish team finished on tenth place.

== Teams ==
Season	Skip	Third	Second	Lead	Alternate	Coach	Events
2007–08	Tuomo Aarnikka	Jari Manni	Harri Haapala	Riitta Särösalo	Seppo Pihnala		WWhCQ 2007 (8th)
2007–08	Jari Manni	Tuomo Aarnikka	Risto Kuronen	Seppo Pihnala			FWhCC 2008 (gold)
2008–09	Vesa Hellman	Tuomo Aarnikka	Jari Manni	Riitta Särösalo	Seppo Pihnala	Lauri Ikävalko	WWhCQ 2008 (7th)
2008–09	Tuomo Aarnikka	Jari Manni	Risto Kuronen	Seppo Pihnala			FWhCC 2009 (gold)
2009–10	Tuomo Aarnikka	Risto Kuronen	Reijo Laakso	Jari Manni	Seppo Pihnala		FWhCC 2010 (bronze)
2010–11	Vesa Hellman	Tuomo Aarnikka	Markku Karjalainen	Riitta Särösalo	Sari Karjalainen	Lauri Ikävalko	WWhCQ 2010 (8th)
2010–11	Tuomo Aarnikka	Osku Kuutamo	Jussi Juntunen	Jorma Nieminen			FWhCC 2011 (bronze)
2011–12	Markku Karjalainen (4th)	Vesa Hellman (skip)	Sari Karjalainen	Tuomo Aarnikka	Riitta Särösalo	Lauri Ikävalko	WWhCQ 2011 (bronze)
2011–12	Tuomo Aarnikka	Seppo Pihnala	Jussi Juntunen				FWhCC 2012 (silver)
2012–13	Markku Karjalainen (4th)	Vesa Hellman (skip)	Sari Karjalainen	Tuomo Aarnikka		Lauri Ikävalko	WWhCQ 2012 (silver)
2012–13	Markku Karjalainen (4th)	Vesa Hellman (skip)	Sari Karjalainen	Tuomo Aarnikka	Mina Mojtahedi	Osku Kuutamo	WWhCC 2013 (8th)
2012–13	Vesa Hellman	Seppo Pihnala	Mina Mojtahedi	Tuomo Aarnikka			FWhCC 2013 (silver)
2013–14	Markku Karjalainen	Sari Karjalainen	Vesa Hellman	Tuomo Aarnikka	Mina Mojtahedi	Osku Kuutamo	WPG 2014 (10th)
2014–15	Markku Karjalainen	Sari Karjalainen	Mina Mojtahedi	Tuomo Aarnikka	Vesa Leppänen	Anne Malmi	WWhCC 2015 (bronze)
2015–16	Markku Karjalainen	Sari Karjalainen	Yrjö Jääskeläinen	Tuomo Aarnikka	Riitta Särösalo	Lauri Ikävalko	WWhCC 2016 (10th)
