= Mina Mojtahedi =

Finnish wheelchair curler and Paralympian

- Curler ♀
- Born: 21 March 1973 (age 53); Tehran, Iran

Team
- Curling club: Hyvinkään Curling / M-Curling

Curling career
- Member Association: Finland
- World Wheelchair Championship: 2 (2013, 2015)
- Paralympic: 1 (2014)
Medal record
Wheelchair curling
World Wheelchair Championship
Bronze medal – third place	2015 Lohja
Finnish Wheelchair Championship
Silver medal – second place	2013

Mina Mojtahedi (born 21 March 1973 in Tehran, Iran) is a Finnish wheelchair curler.

She participated in the 2014 Winter Paralympics where Finnish team finished on tenth place.

In 2018–2020 she lived in Switzerland and competed in 2019 and 2020 Swiss Wheelchair Curling Championship.

She was born in Iran, her father are Iranian and mother are Finnish. They moved from Iran to Scotland when Mina was at the age of 6.

== Teams ==
Season	Skip	Third	Second	Lead	Alternate	Coach	Events
Finland
2012–13	Markku Karjalainen (fourth)	Vesa Hellman (skip)	Sari Karjalainen	Tuomo Aarnikka	Mina Mojtahedi	Osku Kuutamo	WWhCC 2013 (8th)
2012–13	Vesa Hellman	Seppo Pihnala	Mina Mojtahedi	Tuomo Aarnikka			FWhCC 2013 (silver)
2013–14	Markku Karjalainen	Sari Karjalainen	Vesa Hellman	Tuomo Aarnikka	Mina Mojtahedi	Osku Kuutamo	WPG 2014 (10th)
2014–15	Markku Karjalainen	Sari Karjalainen	Mina Mojtahedi	Tuomo Aarnikka	Vesa Leppänen	Anne Malmi	WWhCC 2015 (bronze)
Switzerland
2018–19	Olivier Joseph	Mina Carina Mojtahedi	Laurent Kneubühl	Olivier Godinat	Cedric Fillettaz	Michel Bise	SWhCC 2019 (7th)
2019–20	Mina Carina Mojtahedi	Laurent Kneubühl	Olivier Godinat	Olivier Joseph	Cedric Fillettaz	Cathy Crottaz, Michel Bise	SWhCC 2020 (6th)
