= 2012 World Wheelchair Curling Championship – Qualification Event =

2012 World Wheelchair Curling Championship Qualification Event
- Host city: Lohja, Finland
- Arena: Kisakallio Sports Institute
- Dates: November 5–10, 2011
- Winner: Slovakia
- Skip: Radoslav Duris
- Third: Branislav Jakubec
- Second: Dušan Pitoňák
- Lead: Monika Kunkelová
- Coach: Frantisek Pitoňák
- Finalist: Italy (Andrea Tabanelli)

The qualification event of the 2012 World Wheelchair Curling Championship was held from November 5 to 10, 2011 at the Kisakallio Sports Institute in Lohja, Finland, which hosted the qualification event for last year's World Wheelchair Championships. The event's two top finishers, Slovakia and Italy, qualified for the main tournament in Chuncheon City, South Korea.

The two qualification spots were determined as follows: The nine teams played each other once in the round-robin. At the conclusion of the round robin, the top four teams advanced to the playoffs. Tie-break games were necessary to decide on the top four teams. The playoffs followed the first and second rounds of the page playoff system. In the first round of playoffs, the first seed played the second seed and the third seed played the fourth seed. The winner of the 1 vs. 2 game, Slovakia, qualified for the World Championships, while the loser of that game, Italy, played the winner of the 3 vs. 4 game, Finland, in the Second Place Game. The winner of the second-place game, Italy, qualified for the World Championships.

== Teams ==
Czech Republic	Denmark	Finland
Skip: Radek Musílek Third: Martin Tluk; Second: Stepan Benes; Lead: Michaela Charvátocá; Alternate: Jana Břinčilová; Coach: Jiri Marsa	Skip: Kenneth Ørbæk Third: Henrik Harlev; Second: Preben Nielsen; Lead: Rosita Jensen; Alternate: Sussie Nielsen; Coach: Per Christensen	Fourth: Markku Karjalainen Skip: Vesa Hellman; Second: Sari Karjalainen; Lead: Tuomo Aarnikka; Alternate: Riita Särösalo; Coach: Lauri Ikävalko
Germany	Italy	Japan
Skip: Jens Jäger Third: Caren Totzauer; Second: Martin Schlitt; Lead: Uwe Raschke; Alternate: Heike Melchior; Coach: Bernd Weißer	Skip: Andrea Tabanelli Third: Egidio Marchese; Second: Emanuele Spelorzi; Lead: Angela Menardi; Alternate: Rosanna Menazzi; Coach: Giulio Regli	Skip: Yoji Nakajima Third: Takashi Sakataya; Second: Hiroshi Wachi; Lead: Aki Ogawa; Alternate: Ayako Saitoh; Coach: Michiaki Saito
Latvia	Slovakia	Switzerland
Skip: Aleksandrs Dimbovkis Third: Ojars Briedis; Second: Maris Dzelskalns; Lead: Polina Rozkova; Alternate: Vita Miezite; Coach: Artis Zentelis	Skip: Radoslav Duris Third: Branislav Jakubec; Second: Dušan Pitoňák; Lead: Monika Kunkelová; Coach: Frantisek Pitoňák	Skip: Manfred Bolliger Third: Felix Wagner; Second: Claudia Hüttenmoser; Lead: Eric Decorvet; Alternate: Melanie Villars; Coach: Stephan Pfister

== Round-robin standings ==
Final round-robin standings

Key
Teams to Playoffs
Teams to Tiebreakers

Country	Skip	W	L
Italy	Andrea Tabanelli	7	1
Slovakia	Radoslav Duris	5	3
Denmark	Kenneth Ørbæk	4	4
Finland	Vesa Hellman	4	4
Germany	Jens Jäger	4	4
Switzerland	Manfred Bolliger	4	4
Czech Republic	Radek Musílek	3	5
Japan	Yoji Nakajima	3	5
Latvia	Aleksandrs Dimbovkis	2	6

== Round-robin results ==
=== Draw 1 ===
Saturday, November 5, 16:00

Sheet A	1	2	3	4	5	6	7	8	Final
Switzerland (Bolliger) 🔨	0	2	2	0	1	0	0	2	7
Japan (Nakajima)	1	0	0	1	0	3	1	0	6

Sheet B	1	2	3	4	5	6	7	8	Final
Finland (Hellman) 🔨	0	0	0	1	0	0	1	1	3
Latvia (Dimbovkis)	1	2	1	0	2	1	0	0	7

Sheet C	1	2	3	4	5	6	7	8	Final
Denmark (Ørbæk) 🔨	0	0	2	0	0	1	0	1	4
Slovakia (Duris)	3	1	0	4	1	0	2	0	11

Sheet D	1	2	3	4	5	6	7	8	Final
Czech Republic (Musílek)	0	0	1	0	1	0	2	0	4
Germany (Jäger) 🔨	1	1	0	3	0	1	0	1	7

Italy receives a bye this round.

=== Draw 2 ===
Sunday, November 6, 10:30

Sheet A	1	2	3	4	5	6	7	8	Final
Germany (Jäger) 🔨	1	0	0	2	3	0	3	0	9
Latvia (Dimbovkis)	0	1	1	0	0	2	0	1	5

Sheet B	1	2	3	4	5	6	7	8	Final
Slovakia (Duriš) 🔨	1	0	0	0	1	0	0	0	2
Italy (Tabanelli)	0	2	1	2	0	1	3	0	9

Sheet C	1	2	3	4	5	6	7	8	Final
Switzerland (Bolliger)	0	2	1	3	1	0	0	0	7
Czech Republic (Musílek) 🔨	2	0	0	0	0	1	2	1	6

Sheet D	1	2	3	4	5	6	7	8	Final
Denmark (Ørbæk) 🔨	0	0	0	1	0	0	X	X	1
Finland (Hellman)	1	5	2	0	4	2	X	X	14

Japan receives a bye this round.

=== Draw 3 ===
Sunday, November 6, 16:30

Sheet A	1	2	3	4	5	6	7	8	Final
Czech Republic (Musílek)	1	1	1	1	0	2	1	1	8
Finland (Hellman) 🔨	0	0	0	0	1	0	0	0	1

Sheet B	1	2	3	4	5	6	7	8	Final
Japan (Nakajima)	0	0	0	0	0	0	X	X	0
Germany (Jäger) 🔨	2	3	1	2	1	3	X	X	12

Sheet C	1	2	3	4	5	6	7	8	Final
Latvia (Dimbovkis) 🔨	1	1	0	0	2	0	0	0	4
Italy (Tabanelli)	0	0	3	1	0	2	1	3	10

Sheet D	1	2	3	4	5	6	7	8	Final
Slovakia (Duris)	0	0	3	1	1	0	1	0	6
Switzerland (Bolliger) 🔨	4	3	0	0	0	1	0	2	10

Denmark receives a bye this round.

=== Draw 4 ===
Monday, November 7, 10:30

Sheet A	1	2	3	4	5	6	7	8	Final
Italy (Tabanelli) 🔨	0	1	0	0	0	1	2	1	5
Switzerland (Bolliger)	0	0	1	0	2	0	0	0	3

Sheet B	1	2	3	4	5	6	7	8	Final
Denmark (Ørbæk)	2	0	0	3	3	3	2	X	13
Czech Republic (Musílek) 🔨	0	2	3	0	0	0	0	X	5

Sheet C	1	2	3	4	5	6	7	8	Final
Finland (Hellman) 🔨	2	2	1	0	0	0	1	1	7
Germany (Jäger)	0	0	0	2	1	1	0	0	4

Sheet D	1	2	3	4	5	6	7	8	Final
Japan (Nakajima)	0	1	2	3	0	0	0	X	6
Latvia (Dimbovkis) 🔨	4	0	0	0	1	4	1	X	10

Slovakia receives a bye this round.

=== Draw 5 ===
Monday, November 7, 16:30

Sheet A	1	2	3	4	5	6	7	8	Final
Latvia (Dimbovkis)	0	0	0	0	3	0	0	X	3
Denmark (Ørbæk) 🔨	5	1	3	2	0	2	2	X	15

Sheet B	1	2	3	4	5	6	7	8	Final
Switzerland (Bolliger)	0	0	2	0	2	0	2	0	6
Finland (Hellman) 🔨	1	1	0	2	0	1	0	3	8

Sheet C	1	2	3	4	5	6	7	8	Final
Slovakia (Duris)	1	0	0	0	0	2	0	0	3
Japan (Nakajima) 🔨	0	1	2	1	3	0	1	1	9

Sheet D	1	2	3	4	5	6	7	8	Final
Germany (Jäger) 🔨	0	0	1	0	0	0	X	X	1
Italy (Tabanelli)	2	0	0	4	3	2	X	X	11

Czech Republic receives a bye this round.

=== Draw 6 ===
Tuesday, November 8, 10:30

Sheet A	1	2	3	4	5	6	7	8	EE	Final
Finland (Hellman) 🔨	1	0	0	2	0	1	0	2	0	6
Slovakia (Duris)	0	1	1	0	3	0	1	0	1	7

Sheet B	1	2	3	4	5	6	7	8	EE	Final
Italy (Tabanelli)	0	3	2	0	0	0	0	1	0	6
Japan (Nakajima) 🔨	2	0	0	1	1	0	2	0	2	8

Sheet C	1	2	3	4	5	6	7	8	Final
Czech Republic (Musílek) 🔨	1	1	0	1	2	0	1	1	7
Latvia (Dimbovkis)	0	0	3	0	0	1	0	0	4

Sheet D	1	2	3	4	5	6	7	8	Final
Switzerland (Bolliger)	1	1	0	0	2	0	1	0	5
Denmark (Ørbæk)	0	0	2	2	0	1	0	1	6

Germany receives a bye this round.

=== Draw 7 ===
Tuesday, November 8, 16:30

Sheet A	1	2	3	4	5	6	7	8	Final
Japan (Nakajima)	1	0	0	1	1	0	1	0	4
Czech Republic (Musílek) 🔨	0	1	1	0	0	1	0	2	5

Sheet B	1	2	3	4	5	6	7	8	Final
Germany (Jäger) 🔨	0	0	0	0	3	0	1	0	4
Denmark (Ørbæk)	1	1	2	1	0	3	0	1	9

Sheet C	1	2	3	4	5	6	7	8	Final
Italy (Tabanelli) 🔨	0	3	0	1	0	0	1	1	6
Finland (Hellman)	2	0	0	0	2	1	0	0	5

Sheet D	1	2	3	4	5	6	7	8	Final
Latvia (Dimbovkis) 🔨	0	0	1	2	2	0	0	0	5
Slovakia (Duris)	1	1	0	0	0	2	1	1	6

Switzerland receives a bye this round.

=== Draw 8 ===
Wednesday, November 9, 9:00

Sheet A	1	2	3	4	5	6	7	8	Final
Denmark (Ørbæk)	0	1	1	0	1	0	1	0	4
Italy (Tabanelli) 🔨	3	0	0	1	0	1	0	3	8

Sheet B	1	2	3	4	5	6	7	8	Final
Czech Republic (Musílek) 🔨	2	0	0	0	2	0	0	X	4
Slovakia (Duris)	0	1	3	1	0	1	2	X	8

Sheet C	1	2	3	4	5	6	7	8	Final
Germany (Jäger)	0	1	0	0	0	1	1	3	6
Switzerland (Bolliger) 🔨	1	0	0	1	1	0	0	0	3

Sheet D	1	2	3	4	5	6	7	8	Final
Finland (Hellman)	2	2	0	1	0	1	0	2	8
Japan (Nakajima) 🔨	0	0	1	0	2	0	2	0	5

Latvia receives a bye this round.

=== Draw 9 ===
Wednesday, November 9, 14:30

Sheet A	1	2	3	4	5	6	7	8	Final
Slovakia (Duris)	2	0	0	1	2	0	0	2	7
Germany (Jäger) 🔨	0	1	1	0	0	2	1	0	5

Sheet B	1	2	3	4	5	6	7	8	Final
Latvia (Dimbovkis) 🔨	1	1	0	0	0	0	2	0	4
Switzerland (Bolliger)	0	0	1	3	1	1	0	3	9

Sheet C	1	2	3	4	5	6	7	8	EE	Final
Japan (Nakajima)	2	1	0	1	0	1	0	0	1	6
Denmark (Ørbæk) 🔨	0	0	1	0	1	0	1	2	0	5

Sheet D	1	2	3	4	5	6	7	8	Final
Italy (Tabanelli) 🔨	1	2	1	1	0	1	1	X	7
Czech Republic (Musílek)	0	0	0	0	1	0	0	X	1

Finland receives a bye this round.

== Tiebreakers ==
Wednesday, November 9, 19:00

Sheet A	1	2	3	4	5	6	7	8	Final
Finland (Hellman) 🔨	1	1	2	0	1	0	2	X	7
Switzerland (Bolliger)	0	0	0	2	0	1	0	X	3

Sheet D	1	2	3	4	5	6	7	8	Final
Denmark (Ørbæk) 🔨	1	0	2	0	0	1	1	0	5
Germany (Jäger)	0	4	0	1	1	0	0	1	7

== Playoffs ==
Second Place Game
1	Italy Q	6
3	Finland	5

Semifinals
1	Italy	9
2	Slovakia Q	10
3	Finland	13
4	Germany	2

=== 1 vs. 2 ===
Thursday, November 10, 10:30

Sheet C	1	2	3	4	5	6	7	8	Final
Italy (Tabanelli) 🔨	2	1	0	3	0	3	0	0	9
Slovakia (Duris)	0	0	4	0	2	0	2	2	10

Slovakia is qualified to participate in the Worlds
Italy moves to Second Place Game

=== 3 vs. 4 ===
Thursday, November 10, 10:30

Sheet B	1	2	3	4	5	6	7	8	Final
Finland (Hellman) 🔨	1	2	0	6	4	0	X	X	13
Germany (Jäger)	0	0	1	0	0	1	X	X	2

Finland advances to Second Place Game

=== Second Place Game ===
Thursday, November 10, 16:30

Sheet D	1	2	3	4	5	6	7	8	EE	Final
Italy (Tabanelli) 🔨	1	0	0	1	1	0	2	0	1	6
Finland (Hellman)	0	3	1	0	0	1	0	0	0	5

Italy qualified to participate in the Worlds
