= Turan Akalın =

Turkish paralimpic tennis player and curler

Personal information
- Nationality: Turkish
- Born: 1984 (age 41–42)

Sport
- Sport: Wheelchair tennis, wheelchair curling
- Club: İzmit Tenis K. (wheelchair tennis); Istanbul Büyükşehir Belediyesi S.K. (wheelchair curling)

Turan Akalın (born 1984) is a Turkish wheelchair tennis player and wheelchair curler.

In 1998 at the age of 14, he lost his both legs below knee at a train accident in Izmit as he was crossing railroad. Akalın is now working at the Kocaeli University's hospital.

He began with tennis playing in 2004 at the İzmit Tennis Club. Akalın won the singles and the doubles titles at the Turkish Wheelchair Tennis Championship in 2011 and 2012.

In 2012, he began performing wheelchair curling at the Istanbul Büyükşehir Belediyesi S.K., and was admitted to the newly formed national team. Akalın participated as skip at the 2013 World Wheelchair Curling Championship – Qualification Event in Lohja, Finland, at which Turkey made its international debut in this Winter Paralympic sport category. Winning only one game and ranking so 10th, his team missed to qualify for participation at the 2013 World Wheelchair Curling Championship.
