= 2022 World Wheelchair Mixed Doubles Curling Championship =

- Host city: Lohja, Finland
- Arena: Kisakallio Sports Institute
- Dates: April 30 – May 5
- Winner: Sweden
- Female: Sabina Johansson
- Male: Marcus Holm
- Finalist: Hungary (Sárai / Beke)

The 2022 World Wheelchair Mixed Doubles Curling Championship was held from April 30 to May 5 at the Kisakallio Sports Institute in Lohja, Finland. It was the first time the World Wheelchair Mixed Doubles Curling Championship was ever held.

Sabina Johansson and Marcus Holm of Sweden beat Rita Sárai and Viktor Beke of Hungary in the final and won the first ever World Wheelchair Mixed Doubles title. Rikke Iversen and Rune Lorentsen of Norway took home the bronze medals after they defeated Orietta Bertò and Paolo Ioratti of Italy in the bronze medal game.

== Medallists ==
Wheelchair	Gold	Silver	Bronze
Mixed Doubles	Sweden; Sabina Johansson; Marcus Holm	Hungary; Rita Sárai; Viktor Beke	Norway; Rikke Iversen; Rune Lorentsen

== Teams ==
The teams are as follows:

Canada	Czech Republic	Denmark	Estonia
Female: Marie Wright; Male: Jamie Anseeuw	Female: Jana Břinčilová; Male: Martin Tluk	Female: Sussie Nielsen; Male: Kenneth Ørbæk	Female: Signe Falkenberg; Male: Mait Mätas
Finland	Germany	Hungary	Italy
Female: Sari Karjalainen; Male: Markku Karjalainen	Female: Christiane Putzich; Male: Burkhard Möller	Female: Rita Sárai; Male: Viktor Beke	Female: Orietta Bertò; Male: Paolo Ioratti
Japan	Latvia	Norway	Scotland
Female: Yuri Muramatsu; Male: Hiroshi Wachi	Female: Poļina Rožkova; Male: Agris Lasmans	Female: Rikke Iversen; Male: Rune Lorentsen	Female: Meggan Dawson-Farrell; Male: Gregor Ewan
Slovakia	South Korea	Sweden	Switzerland
Female: Monika Kunkelová; Male: Radoslav Ďuriš	Female: Yun Hee-kyeong; Male: Jung Young-ki	Female: Sabina Johansson; Male: Marcus Holm	Female: Beatrix Blauel-Thomann; Male: Marcel Bodenmann
Turkey	United States		
Female: Züleyha Bingöl; Male: Kenan Coşkun	Female: Pam Wilson; Male: David Samsa		

== Round robin standings ==
Final Round Robin Standings

Key
Teams to Playoffs (Top 3 in each group)

Group A	W	L	W–L	DSC
Hungary	6	2	–	165.74
Sweden	5	3	1–0	124.16
Italy	5	3	0–1	131.56
South Korea	4	4	1–0	125.93
Estonia	4	4	0–1	121.09
Switzerland	3	5	3–0	113.17
Scotland	3	5	2–1	133.48
Finland	3	5	1–2	132.10
Japan	3	5	0–3	136.46

Group B	W	L	W–L	DSC
Norway	7	1	–	148.71
Latvia	5	3	–	117.64
United States	4	4	3–0	106.27
Slovakia	4	4	2–1	109.17
Germany	4	4	1–2	96.05
Denmark	4	4	0–3	132.33
Canada	3	5	1–0	103.56
Czech Republic	3	5	0–1	131.22
Turkey	2	6	–	110.44

Group A Round Robin Summary Table
Pos.	Country	Estonia	Finland	Hungary	Italy	Japan	Scotland	South Korea	Sweden	Switzerland	Record
5	Estonia	—N/a	14–4	5–7	10–7	2–9	6–8	2–10	8–4	6–2	4–4
8	Finland	4–14	—	15–3	7–8	9–7	5–6	14–9	6–7	5–10	3–5
1	Hungary	7–5	3–15	—	2–11	10–4	7–4	7–3	11–6	10–9	6–2
3	Italy	7–10	8–7	11–2	—	6–7	11–1	10–9	5–8	9–4	5–3
9	Japan	9–2	7–9	4–10	7–6	—	4–8	2–7	8–6	4–11	3–5
7	Scotland	8–6	6–5	4–7	1–11	8–4	—	5–8	1–9	5–10	3–5
4	South Korea	10–2	9–14	3–7	9–10	7–2	8–5	—	6–7	9–3	4–4
2	Sweden	4–8	7–6	6–11	8–5	6–8	9–1	7–6	—	W–L	5–3
6	Switzerland	2–6	10–5	9–10	4–9	11–4	10–5	3–9	L–W	—	3–5

Group B Round Robin Summary Table
Pos.	Country	Canada	Czech Republic	Denmark	Germany	Latvia	Norway	Slovakia	Turkey	United States	Record
7	Canada	—	7–6	7–8	4–6	8–4	3–9	6–7	5–7	10–4	3–5
8	Czech Republic	6–7	—	8–12	1–9	7–8	4–9	9–8	9–6	7–4	3–5
6	Denmark	8–7	12–8	—	4–7	8–3	5–7	9–11	5–4	5–8	4–4
5	Germany	6–4	9–1	7–4	—	5–9	8–13	4–9	11–3	7–9	4–4
2	Latvia	4–8	8–7	3–8	9–5	—	8–9	8–5	10–4	6–3	5–3
1	Norway	9–3	9–4	7–5	13–8	9–8	—	8–6	5–9	10–4	7–1
4	Slovakia	7–6	8–9	11–9	9–4	5–8	6–8	—	8–5	4–6	4–4
9	Turkey	7–5	6–9	4–5	3–11	4–10	9–5	5–8	—	3–9	2–6
3	United States	4–10	4–7	8–5	9–7	3–6	4–10	6–4	9–3	—	4–4

== Round robin results ==
All draw times are listed in Eastern European Summer Time (UTC+03:00).

=== Draw 1 ===
Saturday, April 30, 9:30

Sheet A	1	2	3	4	5	6	7	8	Final
Estonia (Falkenberg / Mätas) 🔨	2	1	3	0	3	2	3	X	14
Finland (Karjalainen / Karjalainen)	0	0	0	4	0	0	0	X	4

Sheet B	1	2	3	4	5	6	7	8	Final
Scotland (Dawson-Farrell / Ewan)	0	1	0	0	3	1	0	0	5
Switzerland (Blauel / Bodenmann) 🔨	2	0	1	3	0	0	2	2	10

Sheet C	1	2	3	4	5	6	7	8	Final
Sweden (Johansson / Holm) 🔨	1	0	0	4	0	0	0	1	6
Hungary (Sárai / Beke)	0	4	1	0	3	1	2	0	11

Sheet D	1	2	3	4	5	6	7	8	EE	Final
South Korea (Yun / Jung) 🔨	4	0	2	0	2	0	1	0	0	9
Italy (Bertò / Ioratti)	0	3	0	2	0	3	0	1	1	10

=== Draw 2 ===
Saturday, April 30, 13:00

Sheet A	1	2	3	4	5	6	7	8	Final
Latvia (Rožkova / Lasmans) 🔨	0	1	0	0	0	0	3	X	4
Canada (Wright / Anseeuw)	1	0	1	2	2	2	0	X	8

Sheet B	1	2	3	4	5	6	7	8	Final
Czech Republic (Břinčilová / Tluk) 🔨	1	0	0	3	0	2	2	0	8
Denmark (Nielsen / Ørbæk)	0	2	4	0	3	0	0	3	12

Sheet C	1	2	3	4	5	6	7	8	Final
Norway (Iversen / Lorentsen)	0	0	2	2	0	0	3	1	8
Slovakia (Kunkelová / Ďuriš) 🔨	3	1	0	0	1	1	0	0	6

Sheet D	1	2	3	4	5	6	7	8	EE	Final
Germany (Putzich / Möller) 🔨	1	0	2	0	0	1	3	0	0	7
United States (Wilson / Samsa)	0	3	0	1	1	0	0	2	2	9

=== Draw 3 ===
Saturday, April 30, 16:30

Sheet A	1	2	3	4	5	6	7	8	Final
Scotland (Dawson-Farrell / Ewan) 🔨	0	0	2	0	1	1	0	0	4
Hungary (Sárai / Beke)	1	2	0	1	0	0	2	1	7

Sheet B	1	2	3	4	5	6	7	8	Final
Sweden (Johansson / Holm)	0	1	1	0	3	2	0	1	8
Italy (Bertò / Ioratti) 🔨	1	0	0	1	0	0	3	0	5

Sheet C	1	2	3	4	5	6	7	8	Final
Finland (Karjalainen / Karjalainen) 🔨	3	0	4	0	2	0	4	1	14
South Korea (Yun / Jung)	0	4	0	1	0	4	0	0	9

Sheet D	1	2	3	4	5	6	7	8	Final
Switzerland (Blauel / Bodenmann) 🔨	1	0	3	0	5	0	2	X	11
Japan (Muramatsu / Wachi)	0	2	0	1	0	1	0	X	4

=== Draw 4 ===
Saturday, April 30, 20:00

Sheet A	1	2	3	4	5	6	7	8	Final
Czech Republic (Břinčilová / Tluk)	1	2	2	0	0	4	0	0	9
Slovakia (Kunkelová / Ďuriš) 🔨	0	0	0	1	2	0	3	2	8

Sheet B	1	2	3	4	5	6	7	8	Final
Norway (Iversen / Lorentsen) 🔨	2	2	0	5	0	1	0	X	10
United States (Wilson / Samsa)	0	0	2	0	1	0	1	X	4

Sheet C	1	2	3	4	5	6	7	8	Final
Canada (Wright / Anseeuw)	0	0	0	0	1	2	1	0	4
Germany (Putzich / Möller) 🔨	2	1	1	1	0	0	0	1	6

Sheet D	1	2	3	4	5	6	7	8	Final
Denmark (Nielsen / Ørbæk)	1	1	1	1	0	0	1	0	5
Turkey (Bingöl / Coşkun) 🔨	0	0	0	0	1	1	0	2	4

=== Draw 5 ===
Sunday, May 1, 9:30

Sheet A	1	2	3	4	5	6	7	8	Final
South Korea (Yun / Jung) 🔨	4	0	1	1	0	0	3	X	9
Switzerland (Blauel / Bodenmann)	0	1	0	0	1	1	0	X	3

Sheet B	1	2	3	4	5	6	7	8	Final
Hungary (Sárai / Beke)	0	0	1	0	0	2	0	X	3
Finland (Karjalainen / Karjalainen) 🔨	4	1	0	4	2	0	4	X	15

Sheet C	1	2	3	4	5	6	7	8	Final
Scotland (Dawson-Farrell / Ewan) 🔨	1	1	1	0	2	0	3	X	8
Japan (Muramatsu / Wachi)	0	0	0	3	0	1	0	X	4

Sheet D	1	2	3	4	5	6	7	8	Final
Estonia (Falkenberg / Mätas) 🔨	2	1	0	0	2	0	2	1	8
Sweden (Johansson / Holm)	0	0	2	1	0	1	0	0	4

=== Draw 6 ===
Sunday, May 1, 13:00

Sheet A	1	2	3	4	5	6	7	8	Final
Germany (Putzich / Möller) 🔨	1	1	0	1	1	1	2	0	7
Denmark (Nielsen / Ørbæk)	0	0	3	0	0	0	0	1	4

Sheet B	1	2	3	4	5	6	7	8	Final
Slovakia (Kunkelová / Ďuriš) 🔨	3	0	1	0	0	0	0	3	7
Canada (Wright / Anseeuw)	0	1	0	1	2	1	1	0	6

Sheet C	1	2	3	4	5	6	7	8	Final
Czech Republic (Břinčilová / Tluk) 🔨	1	1	1	0	3	0	2	1	9
Turkey (Bingöl / Coşkun)	0	0	0	2	0	4	0	0	6

Sheet D	1	2	3	4	5	6	7	8	Final
Latvia (Rožkova / Lasmans) 🔨	3	3	1	0	0	0	1	0	8
Norway (Iversen / Lorentsen)	0	0	0	3	3	1	0	2	9

=== Draw 7 ===
Sunday, May 1, 16:30

Sheet A	1	2	3	4	5	6	7	8	Final
Japan (Muramatsu / Wachi)	0	3	1	0	1	1	1	1	8
Sweden (Johansson / Holm) 🔨	5	0	0	1	0	0	0	0	6

Sheet B	1	2	3	4	5	6	7	8	Final
South Korea (Yun / Jung) 🔨	1	0	0	3	2	2	2	X	10
Estonia (Falkenberg / Mätas)	0	1	1	0	0	0	0	X	2

Sheet C	1	2	3	4	5	6	7	8	EE	Final
Hungary (Sárai / Beke)	0	1	1	2	4	0	0	1	1	10
Switzerland (Blauel / Bodenmann) 🔨	2	0	0	0	0	4	3	0	0	9

Sheet D	1	2	3	4	5	6	7	8	Final
Italy (Bertò / Ioratti) 🔨	2	2	1	0	4	2	X	X	11
Scotland (Dawson-Farrell / Ewan)	0	0	0	1	0	0	X	X	1

=== Draw 8 ===
Sunday, May 1, 20:00

Sheet A	1	2	3	4	5	6	7	8	Final
Turkey (Bingöl / Coşkun) 🔨	3	1	1	2	0	1	0	1	9
Norway (Iversen / Lorentsen)	0	0	0	0	1	0	4	0	5

Sheet B	1	2	3	4	5	6	7	8	Final
Germany (Putzich / Möller)	0	1	1	0	1	1	0	1	5
Latvia (Rožkova / Lasmans) 🔨	2	0	0	5	0	0	2	0	9

Sheet C	1	2	3	4	5	6	7	8	EE	Final
Slovakia (Kunkelová / Ďuriš) 🔨	0	2	1	0	4	0	2	0	2	11
Denmark (Nielsen / Ørbæk)	1	0	0	3	0	2	0	3	0	9

Sheet D	1	2	3	4	5	6	7	8	Final
United States (Wilson / Samsa)	0	0	1	3	0	0	0	X	4
Czech Republic (Břinčilová / Tluk) 🔨	1	2	0	0	2	1	1	X	7

=== Draw 9 ===
Monday, May 2, 9:30

Sheet A	1	2	3	4	5	6	7	8	Final
Canada (Wright / Anseeuw) 🔨	5	0	0	3	1	1	0	X	10
United States (Wilson / Samsa)	0	2	1	0	0	0	1	X	4

Sheet B	1	2	3	4	5	6	7	8	Final
Denmark (Nielsen / Ørbæk) 🔨	0	1	1	2	0	0	1	0	5
Norway (Iversen / Lorentsen)	2	0	0	0	2	2	0	1	7

Sheet C	1	2	3	4	5	6	7	8	EE	Final
Latvia (Rožkova / Lasmans) 🔨	1	0	1	1	1	1	2	0	1	8
Czech Republic (Břinčilová / Tluk)	0	4	0	0	0	0	0	3	0	7

Sheet D	1	2	3	4	5	6	7	8	Final
Turkey (Bingöl / Coşkun)	0	2	2	0	0	0	1	0	5
Slovakia (Kunkelová / Ďuriš) 🔨	1	0	0	2	1	2	0	2	8

=== Draw 10 ===
Monday, May 2, 13:00

Sheet A	1	2	3	4	5	6	7	8	Final
Finland (Karjalainen / Karjalainen) 🔨	2	0	1	0	2	2	0	0	7
Italy (Bertò / Ioratti)	0	1	0	5	0	0	1	1	8

Sheet B	1	2	3	4	5	6	7	8	EE	Final
Switzerland (Blauel / Bodenmann)	1	1	0	1	0	0	2	1	/	L^
Sweden (Johansson / Holm) 🔨	0	0	4	0	1	1	0	0		W

Sheet C	1	2	3	4	5	6	7	8	Final
Estonia (Falkenberg / Mätas)	0	0	0	4	1	0	0	1	6
Scotland (Dawson-Farrell / Ewan) 🔨	2	2	1	0	0	2	1	0	8

Sheet D	1	2	3	4	5	6	7	8	Final
Japan (Muramatsu / Wachi)	0	2	0	2	0	0	0	X	4
Hungary (Sárai / Beke) 🔨	1	0	2	0	2	2	3	X	10

^Switzerland ran out of time, and therefore forfeited the match.

=== Draw 11 ===
Monday, May 2, 16:30

Sheet A	1	2	3	4	5	6	7	8	Final
Slovakia (Kunkelová / Ďuriš)	0	5	0	2	0	0	1	1	9
Germany (Putzich / Möller) 🔨	1	0	1	0	1	1	0	0	4

Sheet B	1	2	3	4	5	6	7	8	Final
Latvia (Rožkova / Lasmans)	5	1	0	0	3	1	0	X	10
Turkey (Bingöl / Coşkun) 🔨	0	0	1	1	0	0	2	X	4

Sheet C	1	2	3	4	5	6	7	8	Final
Denmark (Nielsen / Ørbæk)	1	0	0	3	0	0	1	X	5
United States (Wilson / Samsa) 🔨	0	2	1	0	1	4	0	X	8

Sheet D	1	2	3	4	5	6	7	8	Final
Norway (Iversen / Lorentsen)	1	0	2	0	3	2	1	X	9
Canada (Wright / Anseeuw) 🔨	0	1	0	2	0	0	0	X	3

=== Draw 12 ===
Monday, May 2, 20:00

Sheet A	1	2	3	4	5	6	7	8	Final
Hungary (Sárai / Beke) 🔨	2	0	2	1	1	1	0	X	7
South Korea (Yun / Jung)	0	1	0	0	0	0	2	X	3

Sheet B	1	2	3	4	5	6	7	8	Final
Estonia (Falkenberg / Mätas)	0	0	1	0	0	0	1	X	2
Japan (Muramatsu / Wachi) 🔨	1	3	0	2	1	2	0	X	9

Sheet C	1	2	3	4	5	6	7	8	Final
Switzerland (Blauel / Bodenmann)	0	0	2	1	0	1	0	X	4
Italy (Bertò / Ioratti) 🔨	4	2	0	0	2	0	1	X	9

Sheet D	1	2	3	4	5	6	7	8	Final
Sweden (Johansson / Holm)	1	0	0	0	3	0	0	3	7
Finland (Karjalainen / Karjalainen) 🔨	0	1	1	2	0	1	1	0	6

=== Draw 13 ===
Tuesday, May 3, 9:30

Sheet A	1	2	3	4	5	6	7	8	Final
Denmark (Nielsen / Ørbæk)	1	4	1	1	1	0	0	X	8
Latvia (Rožkova / Lasmans) 🔨	0	0	0	0	0	2	1	X	3

Sheet B	1	2	3	4	5	6	7	8	Final
United States (Wilson / Samsa)	2	0	0	0	2	0	1	1	6
Slovakia (Kunkelová / Ďuriš) 🔨	0	1	1	1	0	1	0	0	4

Sheet C	1	2	3	4	5	6	7	8	EE	Final
Turkey (Bingöl / Coşkun)	1	0	1	1	1	0	1	0	2	7
Canada (Wright / Anseeuw) 🔨	0	1	0	0	0	2	0	2	0	5

Sheet D	1	2	3	4	5	6	7	8	Final
Czech Republic (Břinčilová / Tluk) 🔨	0	0	0	1	0	0	X	X	1
Germany (Putzich / Möller)	1	1	1	0	5	1	X	X	9

=== Draw 14 ===
Tuesday, May 3, 13:00

Sheet A	1	2	3	4	5	6	7	8	Final
Switzerland (Blauel / Bodenmann) 🔨	0	0	0	0	2	0	0	X	2
Estonia (Falkenberg / Mätas)	1	1	1	1	0	1	1	X	6

Sheet B	1	2	3	4	5	6	7	8	Final
Italy (Bertò / Ioratti) 🔨	4	1	0	4	1	1	X	X	11
Hungary (Sárai / Beke)	0	0	2	0	0	0	X	X	2

Sheet C	1	2	3	4	5	6	7	8	Final
Japan (Muramatsu / Wachi)	0	0	2	1	0	3	0	1	7
Finland (Karjalainen / Karjalainen) 🔨	4	1	0	0	3	0	1	0	9

Sheet D	1	2	3	4	5	6	7	8	Final
Scotland (Dawson-Farrell / Ewan) 🔨	3	0	0	0	0	1	0	1	5
South Korea (Yun / Jung)	0	3	1	1	1	0	2	0	8

=== Draw 15 ===
Tuesday, May 3, 16:30

Sheet A	1	2	3	4	5	6	7	8	Final
United States (Wilson / Samsa)	1	3	0	0	3	1	1	X	9
Turkey (Bingöl / Coşkun) 🔨	0	0	1	2	0	0	0	X	3

Sheet B	1	2	3	4	5	6	7	8	Final
Canada (Wright / Anseeuw)	0	1	1	1	0	3	0	1	7
Czech Republic (Břinčilová / Tluk) 🔨	4	0	0	0	1	0	1	0	6

Sheet C	1	2	3	4	5	6	7	8	Final
Germany (Putzich / Möller) 🔨	0	0	5	2	0	0	1	0	8
Norway (Iversen / Lorentsen)	1	5	0	0	3	1	0	3	13

Sheet D	1	2	3	4	5	6	7	8	Final
Slovakia (Kunkelová / Ďuriš) 🔨	0	1	0	0	0	3	0	1	5
Latvia (Rožkova / Lasmans)	2	0	1	1	1	0	3	0	8

=== Draw 16 ===
Tuesday, May 3, 20:00

Sheet A	1	2	3	4	5	6	7	8	Final
Italy (Bertò / Ioratti)	0	0	1	1	0	2	0	2	6
Japan (Muramatsu / Wachi) 🔨	1	1	0	0	4	0	1	0	7

Sheet B	1	2	3	4	5	6	7	8	Final
Finland (Karjalainen / Karjalainen) 🔨	0	0	0	3	1	0	0	1	5
Scotland (Dawson-Farrell / Ewan)	1	1	1	0	0	2	1	0	6

Sheet C	1	2	3	4	5	6	7	8	Final
South Korea (Yun / Jung) 🔨	2	0	1	0	0	0	3	0	6
Sweden (Johansson / Holm)	0	3	0	1	1	1	0	1	7

Sheet D	1	2	3	4	5	6	7	8	Final
Hungary (Sárai / Beke)	0	1	1	0	1	0	4	0	7
Estonia (Falkenberg / Mätas) 🔨	1	0	0	2	0	1	0	1	5

=== Draw 17 ===
Wednesday, May 4, 9:30

Sheet A	1	2	3	4	5	6	7	8	Final
Norway (Iversen / Lorentsen) 🔨	0	3	1	2	0	0	3	X	9
Czech Republic (Břinčilová / Tluk)	1	0	0	0	2	1	0	X	4

Sheet B	1	2	3	4	5	6	7	8	Final
Turkey (Bingöl / Coşkun) 🔨	3	0	0	0	0	0	0	X	3
Germany (Putzich / Möller)	0	4	2	1	1	2	1	X	11

Sheet C	1	2	3	4	5	6	7	8	Final
United States (Wilson / Samsa) 🔨	0	0	0	0	1	0	2	X	3
Latvia (Rožkova / Lasmans)	2	1	1	1	0	1	0	X	6

Sheet D	1	2	3	4	5	6	7	8	Final
Canada (Wright / Anseeuw) 🔨	1	0	3	0	3	0	0	0	7
Denmark (Nielsen / Ørbæk)	0	1	0	1	0	2	3	1	8

=== Draw 18 ===
Wednesday, May 4, 13:00

Sheet A	1	2	3	4	5	6	7	8	Final
Sweden (Johansson / Holm) 🔨	2	1	2	2	2	0	X	X	9
Scotland (Dawson-Farrell / Ewan)	0	0	0	0	0	1	X	X	1

Sheet B	1	2	3	4	5	6	7	8	Final
Japan (Muramatsu / Wachi) 🔨	1	0	0	0	0	1	0	X	2
South Korea (Yun / Jung)	0	3	1	1	1	0	1	X	7

Sheet C	1	2	3	4	5	6	7	8	EE	Final
Italy (Bertò / Ioratti)	0	3	0	3	1	0	0	0	0	7
Estonia (Falkenberg / Mätas) 🔨	1	0	2	0	0	2	1	1	3	10

Sheet D	1	2	3	4	5	6	7	8	Final
Finland (Karjalainen / Karjalainen)	0	3	0	0	0	2	X	X	5
Switzerland (Blauel / Bodenmann) 🔨	1	0	3	3	3	0	X	X	10

== Playoffs ==
Qualification games
B2	Latvia	6
A3	Italy	11
A2	Sweden	12
B3	United States	3

Semifinals
A1	Hungary	6
A3	Italy	5
B1	Norway	4
A2	Sweden	8

Final
A1	Hungary	5
A2	Sweden	7
Bronze medal match
A3	Italy	5
B1	Norway	12

=== Qualification Games ===
Wednesday, May 4, 20:00

Sheet A	1	2	3	4	5	6	7	8	Final
Sweden (Johansson / Holm) 🔨	0	4	2	0	3	1	2	X	12
United States (Wilson / Samsa)	1	0	0	2	0	0	0	X	3

Sheet D	1	2	3	4	5	6	7	8	Final
Latvia (Rožkova / Lasmans) 🔨	0	3	0	2	0	1	0	0	6
Italy (Bertò / Ioratti)	1	0	5	0	2	0	2	1	11

=== Semifinals ===
Thursday, May 5, 10:00

Sheet A	1	2	3	4	5	6	7	8	Final
Hungary (Sárai / Beke) 🔨	0	0	0	1	2	1	0	2	6
Italy (Bertò / Ioratti)	2	1	1	0	0	0	1	0	5

Sheet D	1	2	3	4	5	6	7	8	Final
Norway (Iversen / Lorentsen) 🔨	0	1	0	0	3	0	0	0	4
Sweden (Johansson / Holm)	1	0	2	1	0	1	1	2	8

=== Bronze medal match ===
Thursday, May 5, 16:00

Sheet C	1	2	3	4	5	6	7	8	Final
Italy (Bertò / Ioratti)	0	3	0	1	1	0	0	X	5
Norway (Iversen / Lorentsen) 🔨	2	0	4	0	0	5	1	X	12

=== Final ===
Thursday, May 5, 16:00

Sheet B	1	2	3	4	5	6	7	8	Final
Hungary (Sárai / Beke) 🔨	0	1	0	2	0	0	2	0	5
Sweden (Johansson / Holm)	1	0	1	0	1	1	0	3	7

== Final standings ==
Place	Team
1st place, gold medalist(s)	Sweden
2nd place, silver medalist(s)	Hungary
3rd place, bronze medalist(s)	Norway
4	Italy
5	Latvia
5	United States
7	Slovakia
8	South Korea
9	Germany
10	Estonia
11	Switzerland
12	Denmark
13	Canada
14	Scotland
15	Czech Republic
16	Finland
17	Turkey
18	Japan
