= Vesa Leppänen =

Finnish male wheelchair curler and Paralympian

- Curler ♂
- Born: 3 November 1951 (age 75)

Team
- Curling club: Lappi Kurlinki Ry, Rovaniemi

Curling career
- Member Association: Finland
- World Wheelchair Championship: 2 (2015, 2017)
- Paralympic: 1 (2018)
Medal record
Wheelchair curling
World Wheelchair Championship
| Bronze medal – third place | 2015 Lohja |
Finnish Wheelchair Championship
| Gold medal – first place | 2013 |
| Silver medal – second place | 2010 |
| Silver medal – second place | 2011 |
| Bronze medal – third place | 2012 |

Vesa Leppänen (born 3 November 1951) is a Finnish wheelchair curler.

He participated in the 2018 Winter Paralympics where Finnish team finished on eleventh place.

== Teams ==
| Season | Skip | Third | Second | Lead | Alternate | Coach | Events |
|---|---|---|---|---|---|---|---|
| 2009–10 | Sari Räsänen | Tarja Hänninen | Vesa Leppänen | Markku Karjalainen | | | FWhCC 2010 (silver) |
| 2010–11 | Markku Karjalainen | Sari Karjalainen | Vesa Leppänen | | | | FWhCC 2011 (silver) |
| 2011–12 | Markku Karjalainen | Vesa Leppänen | Sari Karjalainen | | | | FWhCC 2012 (bronze) |
| 2012–13 | Vesa Leppänen | Sari Karjalainen | Markku Karjalainen | | | | FWhCC 2013 (gold) |
| 2014–15 | Markku Karjalainen | Sari Karjalainen | Mina Mojtahedi | Tuomo Aarnikka | Vesa Leppänen | Anne Malmi | WWhCC 2015 (bronze) |
| 2016–17 | Markku Karjalainen | Yrjö Jääskeläinen | Sari Karjalainen | Vesa Leppänen | Riitta Särösalo | Vesa Kokko | WWhBCC 2016 (gold); WWhCC 2017 (10th) |
| 2017–18 | Markku Karjalainen | Yrjö Jääskeläinen | Vesa Leppänen | Sari Karjalainen | Riitta Särösalo | Vesa Kokko | WPG 2018 (11th) |
