= 2016 World Wheelchair Curling Championship =

- Host city: Lucerne, Switzerland
- Arena: Eiszentrum Luzern
- Dates: February 21–28
- Winner: Russia
- Skip: Andrey Smirnov
- Third: Konstantin Kurokhtin
- Second: Svetlana Pakhomova
- Lead: Alexander Shevchenko
- Alternate: Marat Romanov
- Finalist: Norway (Rune Lorentsen)

The 2016 World Wheelchair Curling Championship was held from February 21 to 28 at the Eiszentrum Luzern in Lucerne, Switzerland.

== Qualification ==
- Switzerland (host country)
- Top seven teams from the 2015 World Wheelchair Curling Championship:
  - Russia
  - China
  - Finland
  - Slovakia
  - United States
  - Canada
  - Germany
- Two teams from the 2015 World Wheelchair Curling B-Championship
  - Norway
  - South Korea

=== Qualification event ===
Norway and South Korea qualified for the World Championship from the qualifying event held in November 2015 in Lohja, Finland.

== Teams ==
The teams are listed as follows:

Country	Skip	Third	Second	Lead	Alternate	Coach
Canada	Jim Armstrong	Ina Forrest	Dennis Thiessen	Mark Ideson	Sonja Gaudet	Wayne Kiel
China	Sun Yulong (fourth)	Yu Xinyue	Chen Jianxin (skip)	Xu Lichun	Chen Tao	Ru Xia
Finland	Markku Karjalainen	Sari Karjalainen	Yrjo Jaaskelainen	Tuomo Aarnikka	Riitta Sarosalo	Lauri Ikävalko
Germany	Jens Jäger	Christiane Putzich	Martin Schlitt	Heike Melchior	Harry Pavel	Bernd Weisser
Norway	Rune Lorentsen	Jostein Stordahl	Ole Fredrik Syversen	Sissel Løchen	Jan-Erik Hansen	Peter Dahlman
Russia	Andrey Smirnov	Konstantin Kurokhtin	Svetlana Pakhomova	Alexander Shevchenko	Marat Romanov	Anton Batugin
Slovakia	Radoslav Ďuriš	Dusan Pitoňák	Peter Zaťko	Monika Kunkelová	Imrich Lyócsa	František Pitoňák
South Korea	Yang Hui-tae	Jung Seung-won	Seo Soon-seok	Bang Min-ja	Cha Jae-goan	Beak Jong-chul
Switzerland	Felix Wagner	Eric Decorvet	Claudia Hüttenmoser	Beatrix Blaül	Marcel Bodenmann	Stephan Pfister
United States	Patrick McDonald	Steven Emt	Jimmy Joseph	Penny Greely	Justin Marshall	Steve Brown

== Round-robin standings ==
Final round-robin standings

Key
Teams to Playoffs
Teams to Tiebreaker
Teams Relegated to 2016 B-Championship

Country	Skip	W	L
Norway	Rune Lorentsen	7	2
Russia	Andrey Smirnov	7	2
Switzerland	Felix Wagner	7	2
South Korea	Yang Hui-tae	5	4
China	Chen Jianxin	4	5
United States	Patrick McDonald	4	5
Canada	Jim Armstrong	3	6
Germany	Jens Jäger	3	6
Slovakia	Radoslav Ďuriš	3	6
Finland	Markku Karjalainen	2	7

== Round-robin results ==
All draw times are listed in Central European Time (UTC+01).

=== Draw 1 ===
Sunday, February 21, 16:30

Sheet A	1	2	3	4	5	6	7	8	Final
Norway (Lorentsen) 🔨	2	0	3	1	0	4	0	X	10
United States (McDonald)	0	1	0	0	2	0	1	X	4

Sheet B	1	2	3	4	5	6	7	8	Final
Canada (Armstrong)	0	0	0	0	2	0	0	X	2
Switzerland (Wagner) 🔨	2	1	1	1	0	1	1	X	7

Sheet D	1	2	3	4	5	6	7	8	Final
Germany (Jäger)	0	0	0	0	0	1	X	X	1
Russia (Smirnov) 🔨	1	3	2	2	4	0	X	X	12

=== Draw 2 ===
Monday, February 22, 10:30

Sheet A	1	2	3	4	5	6	7	8	Final
China (Chen)	0	2	1	0	0	4	2	X	9
Finland (Karjalainen) 🔨	4	0	0	1	1	0	0	X	6

Sheet B	1	2	3	4	5	6	7	8	Final
Russia (Smirnov) 🔨	0	0	2	0	2	3	1	0	8
South Korea (Yang)	1	3	0	1	0	0	0	2	7

Sheet C	1	2	3	4	5	6	7	8	Final
Norway (Lorentsen)	1	2	1	3	1	0	0	X	8
Germany (Jäger) 🔨	0	0	0	0	0	1	2	X	3

Sheet D	1	2	3	4	5	6	7	8	Final
Switzerland (Wagner)	1	4	0	0	2	1	3	X	11
Slovakia (Ďuriš) 🔨	0	0	4	1	0	0	0	X	5

=== Draw 3 ===
Monday, February 22, 15:30

Sheet A	1	2	3	4	5	6	7	8	Final
United States (McDonald)	1	1	0	2	0	3	1	1	9
Canada (Armstrong) 🔨	0	0	3	0	3	0	0	0	6

Sheet B	1	2	3	4	5	6	7	8	Final
Norway (Lorentsen)	2	1	0	6	1	0	1	X	11
China (Chen) 🔨	0	0	1	0	0	4	0	X	5

Sheet C	1	2	3	4	5	6	7	8	Final
Slovakia (Ďuriš) 🔨	0	2	1	0	1	2	0	2	8
Russia (Smirnov)	1	0	0	1	0	0	3	0	5

Sheet D	1	2	3	4	5	6	7	8	Final
South Korea (Yang) 🔨	3	0	3	1	2	2	X	X	11
Finland (Karjalainen)	0	1	0	0	0	0	X	X	1

=== Draw 4 ===
Tuesday, February 23, 10:30

Sheet A	1	2	3	4	5	6	7	8	Final
Slovakia (Ďuriš)	0	1	0	0	1	0	0	X	2
South Korea (Yang) 🔨	1	0	1	0	0	1	1	X	4

Sheet B	1	2	3	4	5	6	7	8	Final
United States (McDonald) 🔨	0	2	0	0	1	1	1	0	5
Germany (Jäger)	2	0	1	1	0	0	0	2	6

Sheet C	1	2	3	4	5	6	7	8	Final
Finland (Karjalainen)	1	0	0	0	3	0	1	0	5
Switzerland (Wagner) 🔨	0	1	1	1	0	1	0	2	6

Sheet D	1	2	3	4	5	6	7	8	EE	Final
Canada (Armstrong) 🔨	0	0	0	2	0	3	1	1	0	7
China (Chen)	2	2	1	0	2	0	0	0	1	8

=== Draw 5 ===
Tuesday, February 23, 15:30

Sheet A	1	2	3	4	5	6	7	8	Final
Russia (Smirnov) 🔨	2	3	1	2	0	0	3	X	11
China (Chen)	0	0	0	0	1	1	0	X	2

Sheet B	1	2	3	4	5	6	7	8	Final
Slovakia (Ďuriš)	0	2	0	0	0	2	1	0	5
Norway (Lorentsen) 🔨	0	0	3	1	1	0	0	2	7

Sheet C	1	2	3	4	5	6	7	8	Final
Canada (Armstrong)	0	2	0	0	1	0	0	X	3
South Korea (Yang) 🔨	1	0	2	1	0	1	2	X	7

Sheet D	1	2	3	4	5	6	7	8	Final
Finland (Karjalainen)	0	0	0	0	1	1	X	X	2
United States (McDonald) 🔨	1	3	4	3	0	0	X	X	11

=== Draw 6 ===
Wednesday, February 24, 10:30

Sheet A	1	2	3	4	5	6	7	8	Final
Switzerland (Wagner)	0	1	0	1	0	3	2	X	7
Germany (Jäger) 🔨	1	0	1	0	1	0	0	X	3

Sheet B	1	2	3	4	5	6	7	8	Final
Russia (Smirnov)	0	3	0	0	0	2	1	1	7
Finland (Karjalainen) 🔨	1	0	0	1	2	0	0	0	4

Sheet C	1	2	3	4	5	6	7	8	Final
China (Chen) 🔨	1	0	0	1	0	0	0	2	4
Slovakia (Ďuriš)	0	0	1	0	1	1	2	0	5

Sheet D	1	2	3	4	5	6	7	8	Final
Norway (Lorentsen) 🔨	1	1	1	0	1	2	0	X	6
South Korea (Yang)	0	0	0	1	0	0	1	X	2

=== Draw 7 ===
Wednesday, February 24, 15:30

Sheet A	1	2	3	4	5	6	7	8	Final
Finland (Karjalainen)	2	0	0	0	1	1	0	0	4
Norway (Lorentsen) 🔨	0	2	1	1	0	0	1	1	6

Sheet B	1	2	3	4	5	6	7	8	Final
South Korea (Yang) 🔨	0	2	0	2	0	1	2	X	7
Germany (Jäger)	0	0	2	0	2	0	0	X	4

Sheet C	1	2	3	4	5	6	7	8	Final
United States (McDonald) 🔨	0	1	0	0	0	1	0	X	2
Switzerland (Wagner)	1	0	3	1	2	0	1	X	8

Sheet D	1	2	3	4	5	6	7	8	Final
Slovakia (Ďuriš) 🔨	1	0	0	0	0	2	0	X	3
Canada (Armstrong)	0	1	2	1	1	0	4	X	9

=== Draw 8 ===
Thursday, February 25, 10:30

Sheet A	1	2	3	4	5	6	7	8	Final
South Korea (Yang) 🔨	1	0	0	0	0	1	0	X	2
Switzerland (Wagner)	0	0	1	3	2	0	1	X	7

Sheet B	1	2	3	4	5	6	7	8	Final
Norway (Lorentsen) 🔨	0	0	0	0	0	1	0	X	1
Russia (Smirnov)	0	0	0	0	1	0	2	X	3

Sheet C	1	2	3	4	5	6	7	8	Final
Slovakia (Ďuriš)	0	2	2	1	0	0	0	X	5
Finland (Karjalainen) 🔨	1	0	0	0	4	1	2	X	8

Sheet D	1	2	3	4	5	6	7	8	Final
China (Chen) 🔨	0	0	0	3	0	1	0	X	4
Germany (Jäger)	1	1	2	0	1	0	2	X	7

=== Draw 9 ===
Thursday, February 25, 15:30

Sheet A	1	2	3	4	5	6	7	8	Final
United States (McDonald) 🔨	3	1	2	0	2	0	2	X	10
Slovakia (Ďuriš)	0	0	0	2	0	1	0	X	3

Sheet B	1	2	3	4	5	6	7	8	Final
Finland (Karjalainen) 🔨	2	0	2	0	1	1	4	X	10
Canada (Armstrong)	0	1	0	1	0	0	0	X	2

Sheet C	1	2	3	4	5	6	7	8	Final
South Korea (Yang) 🔨	2	0	3	0	0	3	0	X	8
China (Chen)	0	2	0	1	1	0	1	X	5

Sheet D	1	2	3	4	5	6	7	8	EE	Final
Russia (Smirnov)	2	0	1	0	1	2	0	0	0	6
Switzerland (Wagner) 🔨	0	1	0	2	0	0	2	1	3	9

=== Draw 10 ===
Friday, February 26, 10:30

Sheet A	1	2	3	4	5	6	7	8	Final
Canada (Armstrong)	0	0	0	1	0	0	1	X	2
Russia (Smirnov) 🔨	0	0	3	0	3	1	0	X	7

Sheet B	1	2	3	4	5	6	7	8	Final
Germany (Jäger) 🔨	0	1	0	0	1	0	1	0	3
Slovakia (Ďuriš)	1	0	1	0	0	1	0	3	6

Sheet C	1	2	3	4	5	6	7	8	Final
Switzerland (Wagner)	0	2	0	0	0	0	0	X	2
Norway (Lorentsen) 🔨	1	0	2	1	1	1	1	X	7

Sheet D	1	2	3	4	5	6	7	8	EE	Final
United States (McDonald)	0	1	0	2	0	3	0	0	2	8
South Korea (Yang) 🔨	1	0	1	0	1	0	1	2	0	6

=== Draw 11 ===
Friday, February 26, 15:30

Sheet A	1	2	3	4	5	6	7	8	Final
Germany (Jäger)	1	0	1	0	0	1	5	X	8
Finland (Karjalainen) 🔨	0	0	0	1	1	0	0	X	2

Sheet B	1	2	3	4	5	6	7	8	Final
Switzerland (Wagner)	0	0	0	2	1	1	0	X	4
China (Chen) 🔨	3	1	1	0	0	0	2	X	7

Sheet C	1	2	3	4	5	6	7	8	Final
Russia (Smirnov)	0	0	2	0	4	0	1	3	10
United States (McDonald) 🔨	1	1	0	1	0	4	0	0	7

Sheet D	1	2	3	4	5	6	7	8	Final
Canada (Armstrong) 🔨	3	0	2	0	0	2	1	X	8
Norway (Lorentsen)	0	2	0	2	1	0	0	X	5

=== Draw 12 ===
Saturday, February 27, 9:00

Sheet B	1	2	3	4	5	6	7	8	Final
China (Chen) 🔨	2	0	3	0	4	0	4	X	13
United States (McDonald)	0	2	0	2	0	1	0	X	5

Sheet C	1	2	3	4	5	6	7	8	Final
Germany (Jäger)	0	0	1	0	2	0	0	0	3
Canada (Armstrong) 🔨	1	1	0	1	0	1	1	1	6

=== Tiebreaker ===
Saturday, February 27, 14:00

Team	1	2	3	4	5	6	7	8	Final
Germany (Jäger)	0	1	1	0	3	0	2	X	7
Slovakia (Ďuriš) 🔨	0	0	0	1	0	1	0	X	2

Slovakia is relegated to the 2016 World Wheelchair Curling B-Championship

== Playoffs ==
Page playoff system
1	Norway	3
2	Russia	5
3	Switzerland	4
4	South Korea	6

Semifinal
1	Norway	7
4	South Korea	4

Final
2	Russia	7
1	Norway	4

Bronze Medal Game
3	Switzerland	5
4	South Korea	6

=== 1 vs. 2 ===
Saturday, February 27, 19:00

Team	1	2	3	4	5	6	7	8	Final
Norway (Lorentsen) 🔨	0	1	1	0	0	0	1	0	3
Russia (Smirnov)	0	0	0	2	1	1	0	1	5

=== 3 vs. 4 ===
Saturday, February 27, 19:00

Team	1	2	3	4	5	6	7	8	EE	Final
Switzerland (Wagner) 🔨	0	0	0	2	0	1	0	1	0	4
South Korea (Yang)	0	0	0	0	1	0	3	0	2	6

=== Semifinal ===
Sunday, February 28, 10:00

Team	1	2	3	4	5	6	7	8	Final
Norway (Lorentsen)	0	2	1	0	1	0	2	1	7
South Korea (Yang) 🔨	1	0	0	1	0	2	0	0	4

=== Bronze medal game ===
Sunday, February 28, 15:00

Team	1	2	3	4	5	6	7	8	Final
Switzerland (Wagner)	0	0	2	1	1	1	0	0	5
South Korea (Yang) 🔨	1	1	0	0	0	0	3	1	6

=== Gold medal game ===
Sunday, February 28, 15:00

Team	1	2	3	4	5	6	7	8	Final
Russia (Smirnov)	1	1	0	0	5	0	0	X	7
Norway (Lorentsen) 🔨	0	0	1	1	0	1	1	X	4

2016 World Wheelchair Curling Championship
(Russia)
Russia
3rd title
