= Rune Lorentsen =

Norwegian wheelchair curler

- Curler
- Born: 8 October 1961 (age 65); Tromsø, Norway

Curling career
- Member Association: Norway
- World Wheelchair Championship: 11 (2005, 2007, 2008, 2009, 2011, 2012, 2013, 2015, 2016, 2017, 2019)
- World Wheelchair Mixed Doubles Championship: 3 (2022, 2023, 2024)
- Paralympic: 4 (2006, 2010, 2014, 2018)
Medal record
Wheelchair curling
Representing Norway
Paralympic Games
Silver medal – second place	2018 PyeongChang	Mixed team
World Championships
Gold medal – first place	2007 Sweden	Team
Gold medal – first place	2008 Switzerland	Team
Gold medal – first place	2017 South Korea	Team
Silver medal – second place	2016 Switzerland	Team
Bronze medal – third place	2011 Prague	Team
World Mixed Doubles Championship
Bronze medal – third place	2022 Lohja

Rune Lorentsen (born 8 October 1961 in Tromsø) is a Norwegian wheelchair curler. He won a silver medal at the 2018 Winter Paralympics.

== Life ==
He started wheelchair curling in 2004. He was the skip when Norway won the gold at the World Championships in 2007, 2008, and 2017.

Lorentsen has a table tennis team gold from the European Championship in 1999, and a bronze in 1997.
