= Osku Kuutamo =

Finnish wheelchair curler and coach

- Curler ♂

Team
- Curling club: CC Lahti Ry, Lahti, M-Curling

Curling career
- Member Association: Finland
Medal record
Curling
Finnish Wheelchair Championship
Bronze medal – third place	2011

Osku Kuutamo is a Finnish male wheelchair curler and curling coach.

== Teams ==
Season	Skip	Third	Second	Lead	Coach	Events
2009–10	Pekka Pälsynaho	Pekka Nieminen	Yrjö Jääskeläinen	Osku Kuutamo	Osku Kuutamo	FWhCC 2010 (4th)
2010–11	Tuomo Aarnikka	Osku Kuutamo	Jussi Juntunen	Jorma Nieminen		FWhCC 2011 (bronze)

== Record as a coach of national teams ==
Year	Tournament, event	National team	Place
2013	2013 World Wheelchair Curling Championship	Finland (wheelchair)	8
2014	2014 Winter Paralympics	Finland (wheelchair)	10
2016	2016 World Wheelchair-B Curling Championship	Estonia (wheelchair)	5
