= Kisakallio Sports Institute =

Sports institute in Finland

Coordinates: 60°19′13″N 24°2′40″E

- Kisakallion urheiluopisto
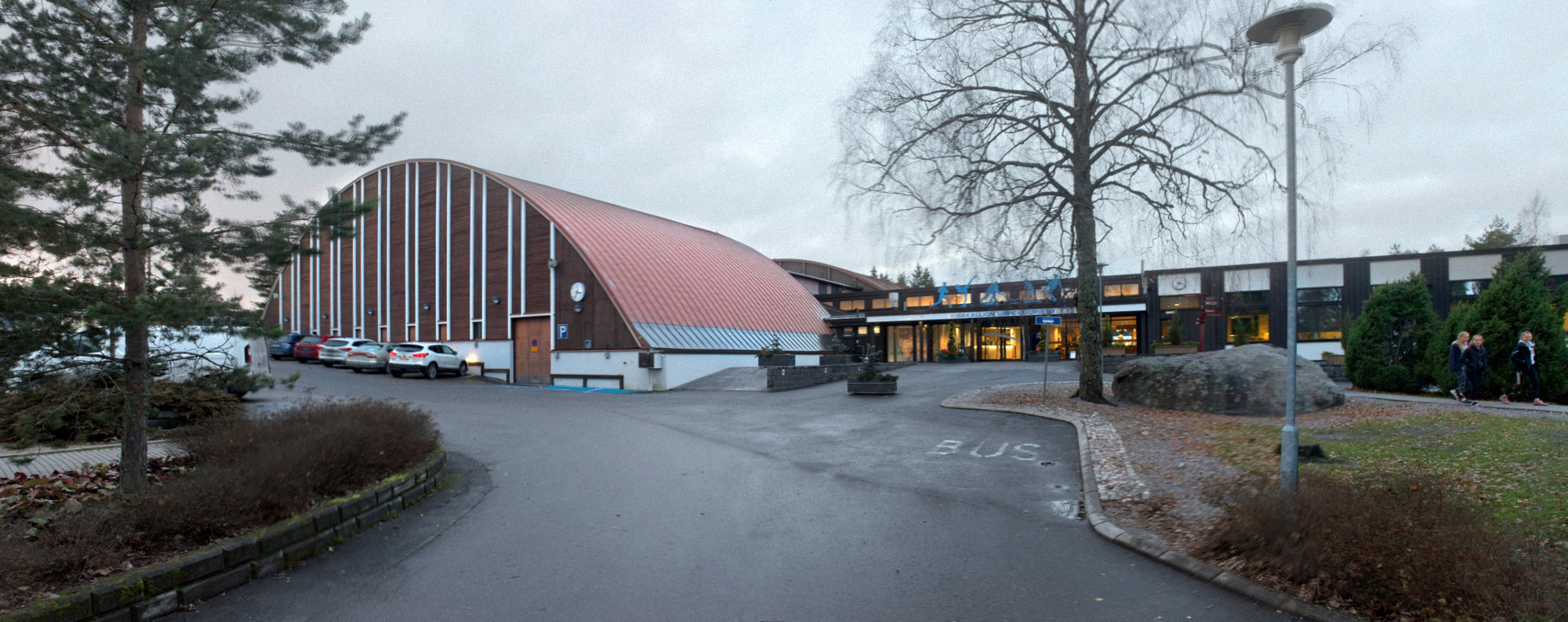
- The Kisakallio Sports Institute in November 2017
- Interactive map of the Kisakallio Sports Institute area

Website
- kisakallio.fi

The Kisakallio Sports Institute, (Finnish: Kisakallion Urheiluopisto) is a sports institute founded in 1949 in the village of Karnainen in the city of Lohja, Finland. Strategic main sports taught at the institute include basketball, canoeing and kayaking, rowing, rhythmic gymnastics and aesthetic group gymnastics, acting as a nationwide coaching centre for the sports.

A core part of the coaching centre is the thorough and diverse development of general motoric skills throughout the sports. Kisakallio acts as a training and accommodation facility for canoeers and kayakers, rowers, artistic gymnasts, footballers, volleyballers, basketballers, floorballers, figure skaters, group skaters, curlers, shooters, orienteers, taekwondo practitioners, dancers, ice hockey players and ringette players. Kisakallio also hosts several sports camps for people of all ages.

Kisakallio has diverse premises and services for sport clubs, companies and schools. The institute area hosts a ball game hall (renovated in 2013, floor surface about 1000 square metres), a practice hall (completed in 2011, about 1000 square metres of taraflex surface), a tennis hall with four courts (completed in 2011), an all-year-round green astroturf football field (completed in 2008, size about 55 × 95 metres), a skills hall (an Olympic arena for rhythmic gymnastics, completed in 2009), an ice hall (completed in 2002), a stadium for small games, a health club, an outdoor tennis court, a curling ice surface, a disc golf track and a hall for artistic gymnastics. The institute is located on the shore of the Lohjanjärvi lake, which allows it to offer canoeing and kayaking and rowing in summer as well as a skating track in winter.

The institute offers accommodation for 700 people. The apartment hotel Katajarinne 1&2 (built in 2008) has 40 rooms (two to five people per room), Katajarinne 3&4 (built in 2011) has 32 rooms and Campus (built in 2003) has accommodation for 60 people. Koivupiha and Rantarinne were built in the 1970s and have been renovated in 2009. The institute also offers dealership villas completed in 2011.

== History ==
The Finnish Sports Education Association for Women founded the Kisakallio Sports Institute in 1949 in Karhusaari, which belonged to the city of Sipoo at the time. At the time, the institute offered courses for female gymnastics and training of female gymnastic coaches. In 1954 the Kisakallio foundation became the new owner of the institute when the institute wanted to dissociate itself from the Finnish Sports Education Association for Women so it could receive support from the Finnish state.

The Kisakallio Sports Institute became a sports institute receiving support from the Finnish state in 1965. The institute was also transferred to better premises so it could offer more diverse services. The village of Karnainen in the Lohja rural municipality was chosen as the new location, and the institute moved there on 3 November 1966. The institute now has a total space of 24 hectares instead of the original 3, and the new premises are significantly larger than the original ones.

In 1979 the Kisakallio foundation and the Finnish Sport Association agreed on cooperation, where the Finnish Sport Association would select members to the board of the Kisakallio foundation. In connection to the agreement the Kisakallio Sports Institute opened also for men and boys, and the first male teacher in the institute was hired. The board of the institute also had male members for the first time.

In 1993 the institute received permission to provide professional training aiming at a basic degree in sports coaching. This made the institute into a professional institute.

When the central position of the Finnish Sports Association ended, the rules of the Kisakallio foundation were changed in 1994 so that the board of the foundation consists of the Finnish Sports Education Association for Women alone.

The institute was significantly expanded in 1983 and 1984 by renovating and expanding the main building. In 2007 a ground source heat pump was selected as the heating source of the institute. The institute premises and the sport arenas receive heating from the nearby Maikkalanselkä at the lake Lohjanjärvi.

== Education ==
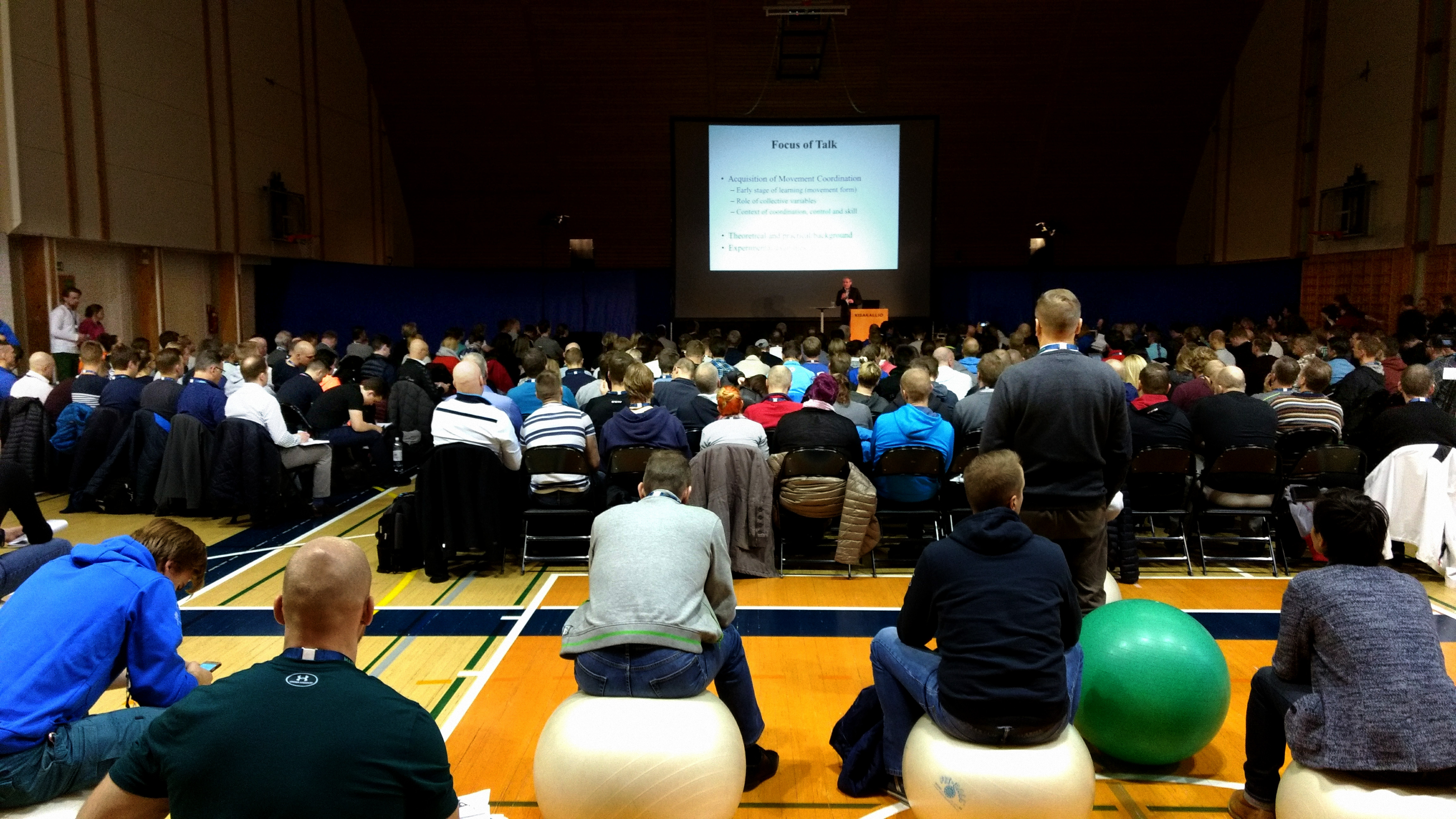
An international coaching seminar at the Kisakallio Sports Institute from 15 to 17 November 2017.

The Kisakallio Sports Institute offers education for sports advisers and sports coaches. The institute also offers professional education for sports (specialising in adult sports) and sports coaches, supplementary education for health testers and supplementary education for ice hockey coaches. The institute also offers apprenticeship education for sports advisers.

== Susi Training Center ==
In December 2013 the Kisakallio Sports Institute and Basketball Finland made a strategic partnership deal making the institute into a practice and coaching centre for Basketball Finland. In summer 2014 the Susi Training Center, built in the place of the institute's old tennis hall, was taken into use, with the institute having invested about 2.3 million euro in it. Basketball Finland has concentrated its national team activity and part of its coaching training in the Susi Training Center. The foundation of the practice centre significantly improved practice possibilities of basketball in Finland, and it was the first place in Finland to take special care of the practice needs in basketball.

The Susi Training Center has a total surface area of about 3000 square metres. It consists of two full-size basketball courts separated with a curtain, with a possibility to combine the courts into an international basketball field on a FIBA certified surface. In addition to the Susi Training Center, the Kisakallio Sports Institute renovated the ball games hall in its main building into the institute's third basketball court, to fit the needs of top-league basketball. As well as the basketball courts, the institute has additional practice facilities (a multi-purpose field of 40×20 metres, a running track for tests and additional practice and a power practice area), service rooms and storage spaces. The premises allow immediate video feedback of the practice. Extra-long beds were acquired for basketball players, and the other premises at the institute can also be used by basketball players.
