= Vesa Kokko =

Finnish wheelchair curler and coach

- Curler ♂
- Born: October 4, 1964 (age 62); Tampere

Team
- Curling club: Tampereen Curling ry, Tampere

Curling career
- Member Association: Finland
Medal record
Curling
Finnish Wheelchair Championship
Gold medal – first place	2010
Gold medal – first place	2011
Gold medal – first place	2012
Silver medal – second place	2008
Bronze medal – third place	2009

Vesa Kokko (born October 4, 1964 in Tampere) is a Finnish male wheelchair curler and curling coach.

As a coach of Finnish wheelchair curling team he participated in 2018 Winter Paralympics.

== Teams ==
Season	Skip	Third	Second	Lead	Events
2007–08	Vesa Kokko	Harri Haapala	Anneli Rämö	Riitta Särösalo	FWhCC 2008 (silver)
2008–09	Vesa Hellman	Vesa Kokko	Riitta Särösalo	Anneli Rämö	FWhCC 2009 (bronze)
2009–10	Vesa Hellman	Vesa Kokko	Riitta Särösalo		FWhCC 2010 (gold)
2010–11	Vesa Hellman	Riitta Särösalo	Vesa Kokko	Mikko Nuora	FWhCC 2011 (gold)
2011–12	Vesa Hellman	Mikko Nuora	Riitta Särösalo	Vesa Kokko	FWhCC 2012 (gold)

== Record as a coach of national teams ==
Year	Tournament, event	National team	Place
2016	2016 World Wheelchair-B Curling Championship	Finland (wheelchair)	1st place, gold medalist(s)
2017	2017 World Wheelchair Curling Championship	Finland (wheelchair)	10
2018	2018 Winter Paralympics	Finland (wheelchair)	11
2018	2018 World Wheelchair-B Curling Championship	Finland (wheelchair)	4
2019	2019 World Wheelchair-B Curling Championship	Finland (wheelchair)	10
