= Oxana Slesarenko =

Russian wheelchair curler

- Curler ♀
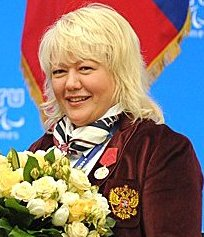
- Born: 27 April 1970 (age 56); Sverdlovsk, RSFSR, Soviet Union

Team
- Curling club: Rodnik CC (Yekaterinburg)

Curling career
- Member Association: Russia
- World Wheelchair Championship: 8 (2004, 2005, 2007, 2008, 2011, 2012, 2013, 2015)
- Paralympic: 1 (2014)
Medal record
Wheelchair curling
Paralympic games
Silver medal – second place	2014 Sochi
World Wheelchair Championship
Gold medal – first place	2012 Chuncheon City
Gold medal – first place	2015 Lohja
Russian Wheelchair Curling Championship
Silver medal – second place	2020 Novosibirsk

Oxana Vladimirovna Slesarenko (Russian: Окса́на Влади́мировна Слесаре́нко; born 27 April 1970 in Sverdlovsk, USSR) is a Russian wheelchair curler.

== Career ==
She is a member of the local sports club "Rodnik" (Yekaterinburg), where she started wheelchair curling in 2003. It was the first wheelchair curling team in Russia.

She was a participant of the 2014 Winter Paralympic games and eight World Wheelchair Curling Championships.

She injured her spinal cord in a car accident in 1986 when she was at the age of 16.

== Awards ==
- Medal of the Order "For Merit to the Fatherland" I class (17 March 2014) – for the huge contribution to the development of physical culture and sports, and for the high athletic performances at the 2014 Paralympic Winter Games in Sochi
- Merited Master of Sports of Russia (2013)
- International Paralympic Committee Athlete of the Month: February 2012.

== Teams ==
Season	Skip	Third	Second	Lead	Alternate	Coach	Events
2003–04	Victor Ershov	Valeriy Chepilko	Andrey Smirnov	Oxana Slesarenko	Nikolay Melnikov	Oleg Narinyan	WWhCC 2004 (9th)
2004–05	Victor Ershov	Andrey Smirnov	Nikolay Melnikov	Oxana Slesarenko	Valeriy Chepilko	Oleg Narinyan	WWhCC 2005 (15th)
2006–07	Nikolay Melnikov	Andrey Smirnov	Valeriy Chepilko	Oxana Slesarenko	Victor Ershov	Oleg Narinyan	WWhCC 2007 (8th)
2007–08	Andrey Smirnov	Nikolay Melnikov	Marat Romanov	Oxana Slesarenko	Oleg Makarov	Efim Zhidelev	WWhCC 2008 (10th)
2010–11	Andrey Smirnov (fourth)	Marat Romanov (skip)	Alexander Shevchenko	Svetlana Pakhomova	Oxana Slesarenko	Vladimir Shevchenko, Anton Batugin	WWhCC 2011 (4th)
2011–12	Andrey Smirnov	Marat Romanov	Alexander Shevchenko	Svetlana Pakhomova	Oxana Slesarenko	Margarita Nesterova	WWhCC 2012 (gold)
2012–13	Andrey Smirnov	Marat Romanov	Alexander Shevchenko	Svetlana Pakhomova	Oxana Slesarenko	Anton Batugin	WWhCC 2013 (5th)
2013–14	Andrey Smirnov	Alexander Shevchenko	Svetlana Pakhomova	Marat Romanov	Oxana Slesarenko	Anton Batugin	WPG 2014 (silver)
2014–15	Andrey Smirnov	Marat Romanov	Oxana Slesarenko	Alexander Shevchenko	Svetlana Pakhomova	Anton Batugin	WWhCC 2015 (gold)
2018–19	Andrey Smirnov	Oxana Slesarenko	Oleg Perminov	Olga Strepetova	Eugeny Pinzhenin	Sergey Shamov, Sophia Yarutina	RWhCC 2019 (silver)
2019–20	Andrey Smirnov	Oxana Slesarenko	Oleg Perminov	Olga Rashchektaeva	Victor Ershov		RWhCC 2020 (silver)
