= Bob Prenoveau =

American wheelchair curler

- Curler ♂

Team
- Curling club: Utica CC, Utica

Curling career
- Member Association: United States
- World Wheelchair Championship: 1 (2005, 2008)
Medal record
Wheelchair curling
World Wheelchair Championship
Bronze medal – third place	2008 Sursee

Robert "Bob" Prenoveau is an American wheelchair curler.

At the national level, he is a 2005 and 2008 United States wheelchair curling champions curler.

== Teams ==
Season	Skip	Third	Second	Lead	Alternate	Coach	Events
2003–04	Mary Dutch	Loren Kinney	Jim Keith	Bob Prenoveau		Jeff Dutch	USWhCC 2003 (silver)
2004–05	Mark Taylor	James Pierce	James Joseph	Missy Keiser	Bob Prenoveau	Bill Rotton, Diane Brown	WWhCC 2005 (8th)
2007–08	James Pierce (fourth)	Augusto Perez (skip)	James Joseph	Jacqueline Kapinowski	Bob Prenoveau	Steve Brown	WWhCC 2008 (bronze)
