= Andrei Meshcheryakov (swimmer) =

Russian Paralympic swimmer and wheelchair curler

Medal record

Representing Russia

Swimming (S2)

IPC World Championships
Bronze medal – third place	2010 Eindhoven	50m freestyle S3
Bronze medal – third place	2010 Eindhoven	100m freestyle S3
Bronze medal – third place	2010 Eindhoven	200m freestyle S3

IPC European Championships
Silver medal – second place	2011 Berlin	50m freestyle S3
Bronze medal – third place	2011 Berlin	50m backstroke S3

Wheelchair curling

World Wheelchair Championship
Gold medal – first place	2020 Wetzikon	

Russian Wheelchair Curling Championship
Gold medal – first place	2020 Novosibirsk	

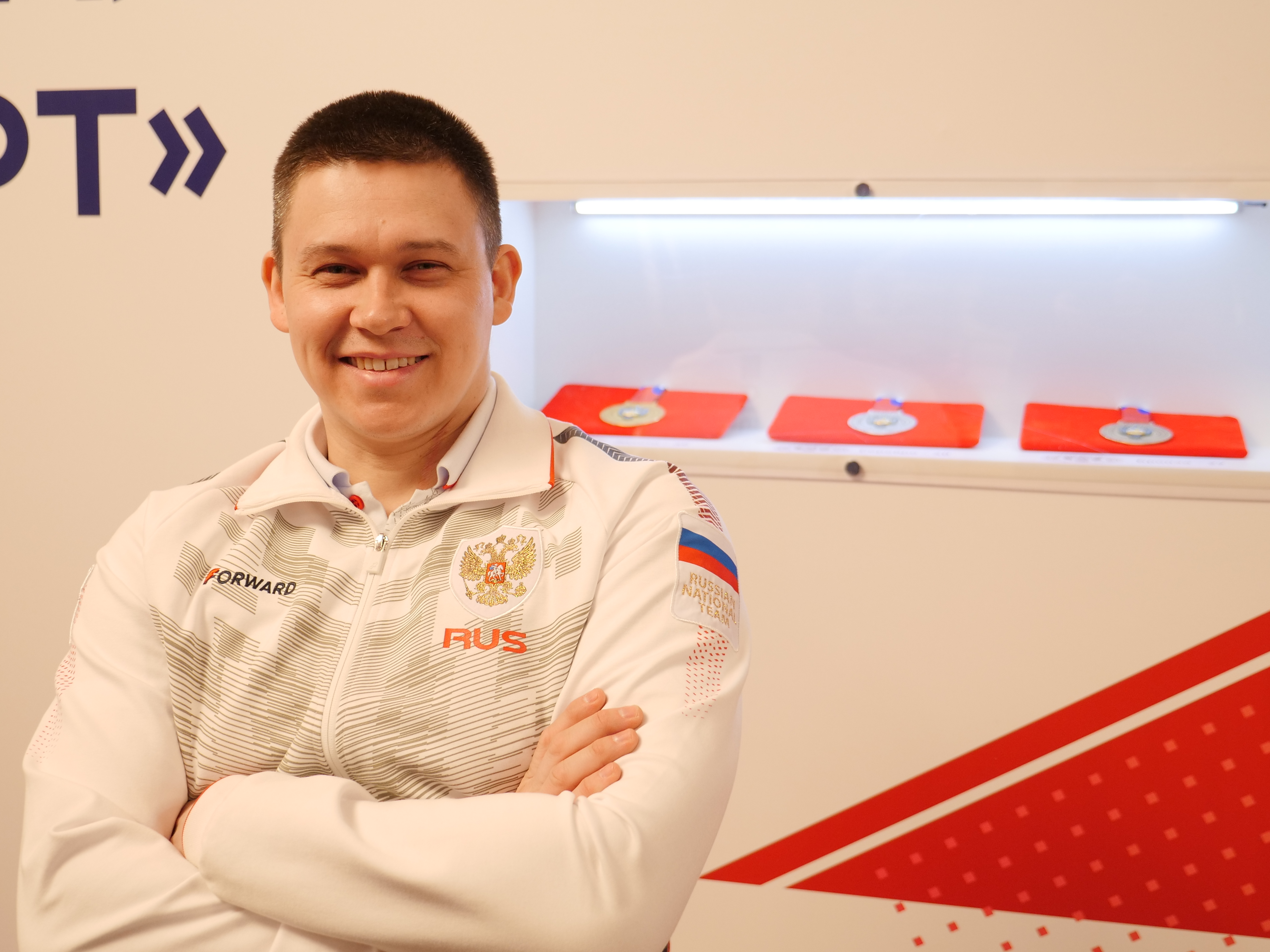
Andrei Meshcheryakov

Andrey Meshcheryakov (born 20 April 1984 in Moscow) is a Russian swimmer and wheelchair curler. He has represented Russia at both the IPC World Championships and the 2012 Summer Paralympics. As a curler he was a participant of the 2018 Winter Paralympic games and World Wheelchair Curling Championships of 2019, 2020; he is a 2020 World champion.

== Personal history ==
Meshcheryakov was born in 1994. He matriculated to Moscow State University of Economics, Statistics, and Informatics where he studied law. He was severely injured in a car accident resulting in permanent disabilities. He is married to Anastasia and as of 2014 has one child. In 2014 he became the first torch barer when the flame came to his home town of Moscow as part of the Winter Paralympics in Sochi.

== Swimming career ==
After his accident Meshcheryakov initially took up table tennis, but switched to swimming as part of his rehabilitation. A water polo player before his injuries, Meshcheryakov showed promise as a parasport swimmer and was coached by Natalia Stepanova. Classified as an S3 swimmer, he competed for Russia at the 2011 IPC Swimming European Championships and won silver in the 50m freestyle behind Ukraine's Dmytro Vynohradets. He followed this with a bronze in the 50m backstroke at the same Championship.

Two years later he again represented Russia, travelling to Montreal to compete in the 2013 IPC Swimming World Championships. There he took three medals, all bronze, in the 50m freestyle, 100m freestyle and 200m freestyle. In 2012 he qualified for his first Summer Paralympics, where he entered four events in the London Games. He failed to reach the final in the 100m S4 freestyle, limited by the fact that his S3 classification was not given its own 100m competition. He qualified for the finals in the 50m breaststroke SB2, 150m individual medley SM3 and the 50m backstroke S3 but he was unable to medal.

== Curling teams and events ==
Season	Skip	Third	Second	Lead	Alternate	Coach	Events
2017–18	Konstantin Kurokhtin	Marat Romanov	Alexander Shevchenko	Daria Shchukina	Andrei Meshcheriakov	Anton Batugin	WPG 2018 (5th)
2018–19	Andrey Smirnov	Marat Romanov	Alexander Shevchenko	Daria Shchukina	Andrei Meshcheriakov	Anton Batugin, Margarita Nesterova	WWhCC 2019 (7th)
2019–20	Andrei Meshcheryakov	Alexander Shevchenko	Maksim Volkov	Aleksandra Chechyotkina			RWhCC 2020 (gold)
2019–20	Konstantin Kurokhtin	Andrei Meshcheriakov	Vitaly Danilov	Daria Shchukina	Anna Karpushina	Anton Batugin, Sergey Shamov	WWhCC 2020 (gold)
