= Nikolay Melnikov (curler) =

Russian wheelchair curler (born 1964)

- Curler ♂
- Born: 13 August 1964 (age 62)

Team
- Curling club: Rodnik CC (Yekaterinburg)

Curling career
- Member Association: Russia
- World Wheelchair Championship: 4 (2004, 2005, 2007, 2008)
Medal record
Wheelchair curling
Russian Wheelchair Curling Championship
Gold medal – first place	2011 Dmitrov
Silver medal – second place	2008 Chelyabinsk
Bronze medal – third place	2014 Izhevsk

Nikolay Vladimirovich Melnikov (Russian: Никола́й Влади́мирович Ме́льников; born 13 August 1964) is a Russian wheelchair curler.

== Teams ==
Season	Skip	Third	Second	Lead	Alternate	Coach	Events
2003–04	Victor Ershov	Valeriy Chepilko	Andrey Smirnov	Oxana Slesarenko	Nikolay Melnikov	Oleg Narinyan	WWhCC 2004 (9th)
2004–05	Victor Ershov	Andrey Smirnov	Nikolay Melnikov	Oxana Slesarenko	Valeriy Chepilko	Oleg Narinyan	WWhCC 2005 (15th)
2006–07	Victor Ershov	Andrey Smirnov	Oxana Slesarenko	Nikolay Melnikov	Valeriy Chepilko	Vladimir Zubkov	WWhCQ 2006 (gold)
2006–07	Nikolay Melnikov	Andrey Smirnov	Valeriy Chepilko	Oxana Slesarenko	Victor Ershov	Oleg Narinyan	WWhCC 2007 (8th)
2007–08	Andrey Smirnov	Oxana Slesarenko	Nikolay Melnikov	Valeriy Chepilko			RWhCC 2008 (silver)
2007–08	Andrey Smirnov	Nikolay Melnikov	Marat Romanov	Oxana Slesarenko	Oleg Makarov	Efim Zhidelev	WWhCC 2008 (10th)
2008–09	Marat Romanov	Andrey Smirnov	Nikolay Melnikov	Oxana Slesarenko	Mikhail Mokretsov	Alexandra Ryzkova	WWhCQ 2008 (bronze)
2009–10	Andrey Smirnov	Oxana Slesarenko	Ivan Spiridonov	Nikolay Melnikov	Victor Ershov		RWhCC 2010 (4th)
2010–11	Andrey Smirnov	Oxana Slesarenko	Ivan Spiridonov	Nikolay Melnikov			RWhCC 2011 (gold)
2013–14	Andrey Smirnov	Oxana Slesarenko	Olga Strepetova	Nikolay Melnikov	Victor Ershov		RWhCC 2014 (bronze)
