= Paul Aksel Johansen =

Norwegian wheelchair curler and sport shooter

- Curler ♂
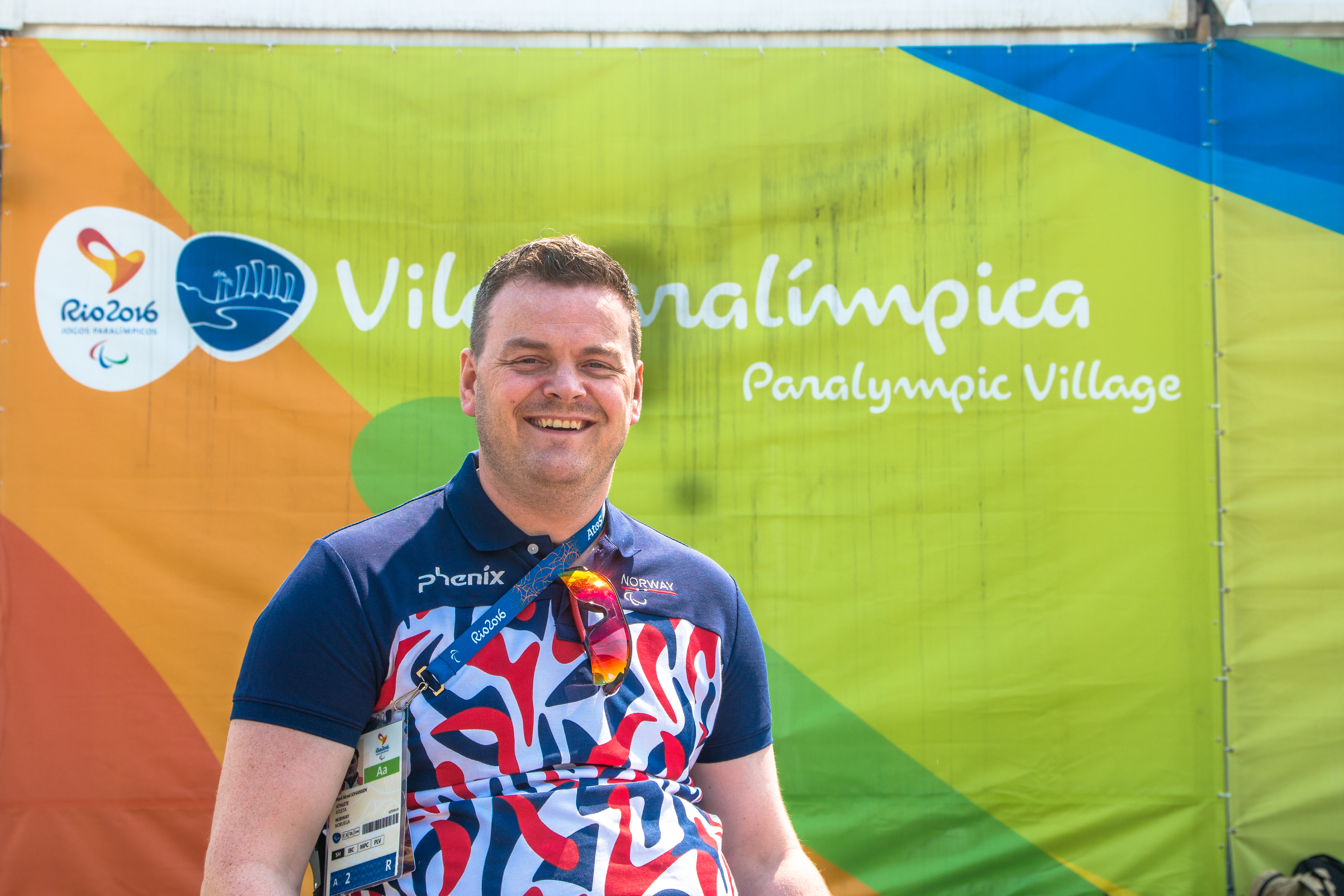
- Born: 25 October 1979 (age 47); Bjugn Municipality

Team
- Curling club: Trondheim Curlingklubb, Trondheim

Curling career
- Member Association: Norway
- World Wheelchair Championship: 6 (2004, 2005, 2007, 2008, 2009, 2020)
- Paralympic: Winter: 1 (2006), Summer: 2 (2012, 2016)
Medal record
Wheelchair curling

Paul Aksel Johansen (born 25 October 1979 in Bjugn Municipality) is a Norwegian wheelchair curler and sport shooter.

He represents Trondheim Curling Club and Ørland Pistol Club.

He is in a wheelchair, after he broke his neck in a car accident in May 2000.

He started playing wheelchair curling in 2003. As a wheelchair curler he participated at the 2006 Winter Paralympics where Norwegian team came in 4th place.

He began sport shooting in 2008. During the 2012 Summer Paralympics, he participated in shooting 10 meters of air rifle and 50 meters of rifle lying. In the 10 meter air rifle, he came in 37th place in the qualification, with 592 points, and did not reach the final. Lying on a rifle, he came in 35th place in the qualification, and did not reach the final here either.

During the 2016 Summer Paralympics, he participated in mixed 10 m air rifle prone SH1 (came in 28th place with 627.2 points) and mixed 50 m air rifle prone SH1 (came in 16th place with 611.3 points).

He was qualified to represent Norway at the 2020 Summer Paralympics in shooting (R6 - Mixed 50m Rifle Prone SH1).

== Wheelchair curling teams and events ==
Season	Skip	Third	Second	Lead	Alternate	Coach	Events
2003–04	Paul Aksel Johansen	Geir Arne Skogstad	Lene Tystad	Trine Fissum		Gry Roaldseth	WWhCC 2004 (12th)
2004–05	Paul Aksel Johansen	Geir Arne Skogstad	Lene Tystad	Trine Fissum	Rune Lorentsen	Ingrid Claussen	WWhCC 2005 (5th)
2005–06	Geir Arne Skogstad	Rune Lorentsen	Paul Aksel Johansen	Trine Fissum	Lene Tystad		WPG 2006 (4th)
