= Mark Taylor (curler) =

American wheelchair curler

- Curler ♂
- Born: January 7, 1959 (age 67)

Team
- Curling club: Utica CC, Utica

Curling career
- Member Association: United States
- World Wheelchair Championship: 3 (2004, 2005, 2007)
Medal record
Wheelchair curling

Mark Taylor (born January 7, 1959) is an American wheelchair curler.

== Teams ==
Season	Skip	Third	Second	Lead	Alternate	Coach	Events
2003–04	Mark Taylor	James Pierce	Tom Hansen	Mike Cox	Maureen Gartland	Bill Rotton	USWhCC 2003 (silver)
2003–04	Wes Smith	Mark Taylor	Sam Woodward	Loren Kinney	Danelle Libby	Diane Brown	WWhCC 2004 (5th)
2004–05	Mark Taylor	James Pierce	James Joseph	Missy Keiser	Bob Prenoveau	Bill Rotton, Diane Brown	WWhCC 2005 (8th)
2006–07	James Pierce	Augusto Perez	James Joseph	Danelle Libby	Mark Taylor	James Griebsch	WWhCC 2007 (6th)
