= James Joseph (curler) =

American wheelchair curler and Paralympian

- Curler ♂
- Born: September 1, 1962 (age 64); Utica, New York, U.S.

Team
- Curling club: Utica CC, Utica

Curling career
- Member Association: United States
- World Wheelchair Championship: 10 (2005, 2007, 2008, 2009, 2011, 2012, 2013, 2015, 2016, 2017)
- Paralympic: 3 (2006, 2010, 2014)
Medal record
Wheelchair curling
World Wheelchair Championship
| Bronze medal – third place | 2008 Sursee |

James "Jimmy Jam" Joseph (born September 1, 1962 in Utica, New York) is an American wheelchair curler.

He participated in the 2006, 2010 and 2014 Winter Paralympics where American team finished on seventh, fourth and fifth places respectively.

== Teams ==
| Season | Skip | Third | Second | Lead | Alternate | Coach | Events |
|---|---|---|---|---|---|---|---|
| 2004–05 | Mark Taylor | James Pierce | James Joseph | Missy Keiser | Bob Prenoveau | Bill Rotton, Diane Brown | WWhCC 2005 (8th) |
| 2005–06 | James Pierce | James Joseph | Wes Smith | Danell Libby | Augusto Perez | | WPG 2006 (7th) |
| 2006–07 | James Pierce | Augusto Perez | James Joseph | Danelle Libby | Mark Taylor | James Griebsch | WWhCC 2007 (6th) |
| 2007–08 | James Pierce (fourth) | Augusto Perez (skip) | James Joseph | Jacqueline Kapinowski | Bob Prenoveau | Steve Brown | WWhCC 2008 (bronze) |
| 2008–09 | Augusto Perez | James Pierce | James Joseph | Jacqueline Kapinowski | Patrick McDonald | Steve Brown | WWhCC 2009 (4th) |
| 2009–10 | Augusto Perez | James Pierce | James Joseph | Jacqui Kapinowski | Patrick McDonald | Steve Brown | WPG 2010 (4th) |
| 2010–11 | Augusto Perez | Jim Pierce | Jimmy Joseph | Jacqui Kapinowski | Penny Greely | Steve Brown | WWhCC 2011 (7th) |
| 2011–12 | Patrick McDonald | David Palmer | James Joseph | Penny Greely | Timothy Kelly | Steve Brown | WWhCC 2012 (5th) |
| 2012–13 | Patrick McDonald | David Palmer | James Joseph | Penny Greely | Meghan Lino | Steve Brown | WWhCC 2013 (4th) |
| 2013–14 | Patrick McDonald | David Palmer | Jimmy Joseph | Penny Greely | Meghan Lino | Steve Brown | WPG 2014 (5th) |
| 2014–15 | Patrick McDonald | Steven Emt | Jimmy Joseph | Penny Greely | Meghan Lino | Steve Brown | WWhCC 2015 (5th) |
| 2015–16 | Patrick McDonald | Steven Emt | James Joseph | Penny Greely | Justin Marshall | Steve Brown | WWhCC 2016 (6th) |
| 2016–17 | Steven Emt | Kirk Black | Jimmy Joseph | Penny Greely | Justin Marshall | Steve Brown | WWhCC 2017 (7th) |
