= Valeriy Chepilko =

Russian wheelchair curler (born 1979)

- Curler ♂
- Born: 20 May 1979 (age 47); Yekaterinburg

Team
- Curling club: Rodnik CC (Yekaterinburg)

Curling career
- Member Association: Russia
- World Wheelchair Championship: 3 (2004, 2005, 2007)
Medal record
Wheelchair curling
Russian Wheelchair Curling Championship
Silver medal – second place	2008 Chelyabinsk

Valeriy Nikolayevich Chepilko (Russian: Вале́рий Никола́евич Чепи́лко; born 20 May 1979 in Yekaterinburg) is a Russian wheelchair curler.

== Teams ==
Season	Skip	Third	Second	Lead	Alternate	Coach	Events
2003–04	Victor Ershov	Valeriy Chepilko	Andrey Smirnov	Oxana Slesarenko	Nikolay Melnikov	Oleg Narinyan	WWhCC 2004 (9th)
2004–05	Victor Ershov	Andrey Smirnov	Nikolay Melnikov	Oxana Slesarenko	Valeriy Chepilko	Oleg Narinyan	WWhCC 2005 (15th)
2006–07	Victor Ershov	Andrey Smirnov	Oxana Slesarenko	Nikolay Melnikov	Valeriy Chepilko	Vladimir Zubkov	WWhCQ 2006 (gold)
2006–07	Nikolay Melnikov	Andrey Smirnov	Valeriy Chepilko	Oxana Slesarenko	Victor Ershov	Oleg Narinyan	WWhCC 2007 (8th)
2007–08	Andrey Smirnov	Oxana Slesarenko	Nikolay Melnikov	Valeriy Chepilko			RWhCC 2008 (silver)
