= Russian Wheelchair Curling Championship =

The Russian Wheelchair Curling Championship (Russian: Чемпионат России по кёрлингу на колясках) is the national championship of wheelchair curling in Russia. It has been held annually since 2007, organized by Russian Curling Federation.

== List of champions and medallists ==
(teams line-up in order: skip/fourth, third, second, lead, alternate, coach)

Year	Host city	Champion	Runner-up	Bronze
2007	Yekaterinburg	Moscow Oblast; Oleg Makarov	Sverdlovsk Oblast; Victor Ershov	Granit (Chelyabinsk); Marat Romanov
2008	championship not held			
2009	Chelyabinsk	Granit (Chelyabinsk); Marat Romanov	Stolitsa (Moscow); Alexander Shevchenko	Sverdlovsk Oblast; Andrey Smirnov
2010	Chelyabinsk	Stolitsa (Moscow); Alexander Shevchenko	Planet of Ice (Moscow); Boris Gorchakov	Granit (Chelyabinsk); Marat Romanov
2011	championship not held			
2012	Dmitrov	Moscow Oblast; Aleksandr Silkin	Stolitsa (Moscow); Alexander Shevchenko	Rodnik (Sverdlovsk Oblast); Andrey Smirnov
2013	Dmitrov	Moscow 2 Konstantin Kurokhtin	Monolith (Saint Petersburg); Nikolay Yakushkin	Moscow Oblast; Valery Ulianov
2014	Izhevsk	Moscow; Konstantin Kurokhtin	Moscow Oblast; Svetlana Pakhomova	Sverdlovsk Oblast; Andrey Smirnov
2015	Dmitrov	Team Chelyabinsk Oblast; Aleksey Fatuev	Team Sverdlovsk Oblast; Andrey Smirnov	Team Moscow; Konstantin Kurokhtin
2016	Chelyabinsk	Team Moscow; Konstantin Kurokhtin, Alexander Shevchenko, Andrei Meshcheryakov, Aleksandra Chechyotkina	Team Moscow Oblast 1 Svetlana Pakhomova, Valery Ulianov, Vitaly Danilov, Vladislav Makarov	Team Sverdlovsk Oblast 1 Andrey Smirnov, Oxana Slesarenko, Eugeny Pinzhenin, Olga Strepetova
2017	Sochi	Team Moscow Oblast; Vladislav Makarov, Svetlana Pakhomova, Valery Ulianov, Vitaly Danilov, alternate: Valery Baranov	Team Moscow; Konstantin Kurokhtin, Andrei Meshcheryakov, Aleksandra Chechyotkina, Boris Gorchakov	Team Sverdlovsk Oblast; Andrey Smirnov, Oxana Slesarenko, Victor Ershov, Oleg Perminov, alternate: Olga Strepetova
2018	Sochi	Moscow; Konstantin Kurokhtin, Andrei Meshcheryakov, Maksim Volkov, Aleksandra Chechyotkina, alternate: Alexander Shevchenko	Rodnik (Sverdlovsk Oblast); Andrey Smirnov, Oleg Perminov, Oxana Slesarenko, Eugeny Pinzhenin, alternate: Victor Ershov	Granit (Chelyabinsk Oblast); Aleksey Fatuev, Marat Romanov, Sergey Ovsyannikov, Daria Shchukina, alternate: Olga Belyak
2019	Krasnoyarsk	Moscow; Konstantin Kurokhtin, Andrei Meshcheryakov, Alexander Shevchenko, Aleksandra Chechyotkina, alternate: Maksim Volkov, coach: Margarita Nesterova	Rodnik (Sverdlovsk Oblast); Andrey Smirnov, Oxana Slesarenko, Oleg Perminov, Olga Strepetova, alternate: Eugeny Pinzhenin, coaches: Sergey Shamov, Sophia Yarutina	Sevastopol; Vladimir Lyubovich, Vadim Gusev, Alexander Rybkin, Natalia Kuzminova, coach: A.E. Tsaplin
2020	Novosibirsk	Moscow; Andrei Meshcheryakov, Alexander Shevchenko, Maksim Volkov, Aleksandra Chechyotkina	Rodnik (Sverdlovsk Oblast); Andrey Smirnov, Oxana Slesarenko, Oleg Perminov, Olga Rashchektaeva, alternate: Victor Ershov	Moscow Oblast; Valery Ulianov, Vitaly Danilov, Vladislav Makarov, Rimma Mambetkarimova
2021	Novosibirsk	Moscow; Konstantin Kurokhtin, Andrei Meshcheryakov, Alexander Shevchenko, Aleksandra Chechyotkina, alternate: Maksim Volkov, coach: Margarita Nesterova	Granit (Chelyabinsk Oblast); Aleksey Fatuev, Daria Shchukina, Sergey Ovsyannikov, Olga Belyak, alternate: Nikolay Korotkov, coach: A.V. Zhitnyak	Adamant (Saint Petersburg); Alexey Lyubimtsev, Anna Karpushina, Nikolai Yakushkin, Maxim Zagorsky, alternate: Mikhail Sorokin, coaches: Anna Karpushina, P.S. Zakharov
2022	Samara	Moscow; Konstantin Kurokhtin, Andrei Meshcheryakov, Alexander Shevchenko, Aleksandra Chechyotkina, alternate: Maksim Volkov, coach: Margarita Nesterova	Granit (Chelyabinsk Oblast); Aleksey Fatuev, Nikolay Korotkov, Daria Shchukina, Olga Belyak, alternate: Sergey Ovsyannikov, coach: A.V. Zhitnyak	Saint Petersburg 2 Alexey Lyubimtsev, Anna Karpushina, Maxim Zagorsky, Alexey Zhukov, coach: I.O. Badilin
2023	Novosibirsk	Moscow; Konstantin Kurokhtin, Andrei Meshcheryakov, Alexander Shevchenko, Aleksandra Chechyotkina, alternate: Maksim Volkov, coaches: Margarita Nesterova, Andrei Meshcheryakov	Moscow Oblast; Valery Ulianov, Vitaly Danilov, Alexander Komrakov, Rimma Mambetkarimova, coach: K.F. Gretsky	Krasnoyarsk Krai 1 Evgeny Sapetov, Maxim Krasnov, Evgeny Gorbunov, Olesya Chernykh, alternate: Oleg Ponomarev, coaches: D.A. Kashmetov, V.I. Dyachkov
2024	Novosibirsk	Moscow; Konstantin Kurokhtin, Andrei Meshcheryakov, Alexander Shevchenko, Aleksandra Chechyotkina, alternate: Vladimir Romanov, coach: Margarita Nesterova	Saint Petersburg; Alexey Lyubimtsev, Anna Karpushina, Nikolai Yakushkin, Maxim Zagorsky, alternate: Mikhail Sorokin, coaches: Anna Karpushina, I.O. Badilin	Samara Oblast; Igor Ruzheinikov, Vasily Petin, Elena Lebedeva, Lada Zinovieva, coach: M.S. Manikhin

== See also ==
- Russian Men's Curling Championship
- Russian Women's Curling Championship
- Russian Mixed Curling Championship
- Russian Mixed Doubles Curling Championship
- Russian Junior Curling Championships
- Russian Senior Curling Championships
- Russian Wheelchair Mixed Doubles Curling Championship
- Russian Wheelchair Curling Cup
