= Lene Tystad =

Norwegian wheelchair curler and ice sledge speed racer

- Curler ♀
- Born: 25 May 1975 (age 51); Trondheim

Team
- Curling club: Trondheim Curlingklubb, Trondheim

Curling career
- Member Association: Norway
- World Wheelchair Championship: 5 (2004, 2005, 2007, 2008, 2009)
- Paralympic: Ice sledge speed racing: 1 (1998), Wheelchair curling: 2 (2006, 2010)
Medal record
Ice sledge speed racing
Winter Paralympics
Bronze medal – third place	1998 Nagano
Wheelchair curling
World Wheelchair Championship
Gold medal – first place	2007 Sollefteå
Gold medal – first place	2008 Sursee

Lene Tystad (born 25 May 1975 in Trondheim) is a Norwegian wheelchair curler and ice sledge speed racer.

As an ice sledge speed racer she participated at the 1998 Winter Paralympic Games and won a bronze medal at 1000 m LW11 event. She also participated at three ice sledge racing events: 100 m LW11 (5th place), 500 m LW11 (4th place) and 1500 m LW11 (4th place).

As a wheelchair curler she participated at the 2006 and 2010 Winter Paralympics. She is a two-time World wheelchair champion curler (2007, 2008).

== Wheelchair curling teams and events ==
Season	Skip	Third	Second	Lead	Alternate	Coach	Events
2003–04	Paul Aksel Johansen	Geir Arne Skogstad	Lene Tystad	Trine Fissum		Gry Roaldseth	WWhCC 2004 (12th)
2004–05	Paul Aksel Johansen	Geir Arne Skogstad	Lene Tystad	Trine Fissum	Rune Lorentsen	Ingrid Claussen	WWhCC 2005 (5th)
2005–06	Geir Arne Skogstad	Rune Lorentsen	Paul Aksel Johansen	Trine Fissum	Lene Tystad		WPG 2006 (4th)
2006–07	Rune Lorentsen	Geir Arne Skogstad	Jostein Stordahl	Lene Tystad	Trine Fissum	Thoralf Hognestad	WWhCC 2007 (gold)
2007–08	Rune Lorentsen	Jostein Stordahl	Geir Arne Skogstad	Lene Tystad	Anne Mette Samdal	Thoralf Hognestad	WWhCC 2008 (gold)
2008–09	Rune Lorentsen	Geir Arne Skogstad	Jostein Stordahl	Anne Mette Samdal	Lene Tystad	Thoralf Hognestad	WWhCC 2009 (7th)
2009–10	Rune Lorentsen	Jostein Stordahl	Geir Arne Skogstad	Lene Tystad	Anne Mette Samdal	Per Christensen	WPG 2010 (9th)
