= Daria Shchukina =

Russian wheelchair curler

- Curler ♀
- Born: 1 September 1979 (age 47); Chelyabinsk, RSFSR, Soviet Union

Team
- Curling club: Yunost-Metar (Chelyabinsk)

Curling career
- Member Association: Russia
- World Wheelchair Championship: 3 (2017, 2019, 2020)
- Paralympic: 1 (2018)
Medal record
Wheelchair curling
World Wheelchair Championship
Gold medal – first place	2020 Wetzikon
Silver medal – second place	2017 Gangneung

Daria Ivanovna Shchukina (Russian: Да́рья Ива́новна Щу́кина; born 1 September 1979 in Chelyabinsk, Russia) is a Russian wheelchair curler, 2020 World champion.

== Career ==
She is a member of the local sports club "Yunost-Metar" (Chelyabinsk).

She was a participant of the 2018 Winter Paralympic games and three World Wheelchair Curling Championships of 2017, 2019, 2020.

== Teams ==
Season	Skip	Third	Second	Lead	Alternate	Coach	Events
2016–17	Andrey Smirnov	Konstantin Kurokhtin	Alexander Shevchenko	Daria Shchukina	Marat Romanov	Anton Batugin	WWhCC 2017 (silver)
2017–18	Konstantin Kurokhtin	Marat Romanov	Alexander Shevchenko	Daria Shchukina	Andrei Meshcheriakov	Anton Batugin	WPG 2018 (5th)
2018–19	Andrey Smirnov	Marat Romanov	Alexander Shevchenko	Daria Shchukina	Andrei Meshcheriakov	Anton Batugin, Margarita Nesterova	WWhCC 2019 (7th)
2019–20	Konstantin Kurokhtin	Andrei Meshcheriakov	Vitaly Danilov	Daria Shchukina	Anna Karpushina	Anton Batugin, Sergey Shamov	WWhCC 2020 (gold)
