= James Pierce (curler) =

American wheelchair curler (1963–2024)

- Curler ♂
- Born: February 17, 1963; Greenville, South Carolina, U.S.
- Died: January 29, 2024 (aged 60)

Curling career
- Member Association: United States
- World Wheelchair Championship: 5 (2005, 2007, 2008, 2009, 2011)
- Paralympic: 2 (2006, 2010)
Medal record
Wheelchair curling
World Wheelchair Championship
Bronze medal – third place	2008 Sursee

James "Jim" Pierce (February 17, 1963 – January 29, 2024) was an American wheelchair curler.

Pierce was born in Greenville, South Carolina. He participated in the 2006 and 2010 where the American team finished in seventh and fourth places respectively.

Pierce died on January 29, 2024, at the age of 60.

== Teams ==
Season	Skip	Third	Second	Lead	Alternate	Coach	Events
2004–05	Mark Taylor	James Pierce	James Joseph	Missy Keiser	Bob Prenoveau	Bill Rotton, Diane Brown	WWhCC 2005 (8th)
2005–06	James Pierce	James Joseph	Wes Smith	Danell Libby	Augusto Perez		WPG 2006 (7th)
2006–07	James Pierce	Augusto Perez	James Joseph	Danelle Libby	Mark Taylor	James Griebsch	WWhCC 2007 (6th)
2007–08	James Pierce (fourth)	Augusto Perez (skip)	James Joseph	Jacqueline Kapinowski	Bob Prenoveau	Steve Brown	WWhCC 2008 (bronze)
2008–09	Augusto Perez	James Pierce	James Joseph	Jacqueline Kapinowski	Patrick McDonald	Steve Brown	WWhCC 2009 (4th)
2009–10	Augusto Perez	James Pierce	James Joseph	Jacqui Kapinowski	Patrick McDonald	Steve Brown	WPG 2010 (4th)
2010–11	Augusto Perez	Jim Pierce	Jimmy Joseph	Jacqui Kapinowski	Penny Greely	Steve Brown	WWhCC 2011 (7th)
