= 2020 Russian Wheelchair Curling Championship =

- Host city: Novosibirsk
- Arena: Curling club "Pingvin"
- Dates: March 16–23
- Winner: Moscow
- Skip: Andrei Meshcheryakov
- Third: Alexander Shevchenko
- Second: Maksim Volkov
- Lead: Aleksandra Chechyotkina
- Finalist: Rodnik (Sverdlovsk Oblast) (Andrey Smirnov)

The 2020 Russian Wheelchair Curling Championship (Russian: Чемпионат России по кёрлингу на колясках 2020) was held from March 16 to 23 at the Curling club "Pingvin" in Novosibirsk.

== Teams ==
Team	Skip	Third	Second	Lead	Alternate
Adamant (Saint Petersburg)	Nikolay Yakushkin (fourth)	Alexey Lyubimtsev (skip)	Denis Zinoviev	Anna Karpushina	Maxim Zagorsky
Granit (Chelyabinsk Oblast)	Aleksey Fatuyev	Marat Romanov	Sergey Ovsyannikov	Olga Belyak	Daria Shchukina
Krasnodar Krai	Aleksey Golivko	Aleksandr Ermolov	Elena Magdesyan	Rimma Ivankina	
Krasnoyarsk Krai	Vera Maltseva (fourth)	Maksim Krasnov	Viktor Sibirin	Sergey Rylnikov (skip)	Anton Shevchuk
Moscow	Andrei Meshcheryakov	Alexander Shevchenko	Maksim Volkov	Aleksandra Chechyotkina	
Moscow Oblast	Valeriy Ulianov	Vitaly Danilov	Vladislav Makarov	Rimma Mambetkarimova	
Novosibirsk Oblast	Vasiliy Ryazantsev	Oleg Stoyarosov	Aleksandr Shmidko	Vera Ivanova	Pavel Pavlenko
Rodnik (Sverdlovsk Oblast)	Andrey Smirnov	Oxana Slesarenko	Oleg Perminov	Olga Rashchektaeva	Victor Ershov
Samara Oblast	Vasiliy Petin	Igor Ruzheynikov	Elena Lebedeva	Lada Zinovyeva	Vitaliy Gorbunov
Team Sergiyev Posad (Moscow Oblast)	Sergey Mishin	Vladimir Sinyakov	Evgeniy Ignatov	Elena Turkina	
Sevastopol	Vladimir Lyubovich	Aleksandr Rybkin	Vadim Gusev	Nataliya Kuzminova	
Tomsk	Evgeniy Burmistrov	Evgeniy Bogdanov	Anton Ionov	Marina Ivanova	
Udmurtia	Aleksandr Zhuravlyov	Pavel Medvedev	Dmitriy Serebryakov	Olga Verkhotina	

== Round robin ==
=== Group A ===
	Team	Skip	A1	A2	A3	A4	A5	A6	A7	Wins	Losses	Points	DSC, cm	Place
A1	Krasnodar Krai	Aleksey Golivko	*	7:6	9:4	9:5	2:6	13:2	7:5	5	1	11	113,83	2
A2	Granit	Aleksey Fatuyev	6:7	*	10:3	9:2	1:9	13:1	13:4	4	2	10	86,10	3
A3	Samara Oblast	Vasiliy Petin	4:9	3:10	*	9:1	6:9	8:4	13:3	3	3	9	182,94	4
A4	Novosibirsk Oblast	Vasiliy Ryazantsev	5:9	2:9	1:9	*	4:7	12:2	5:10	1	5	7	154,58	6
A5	Moscow	Andrei Meshcheryakov	6:2	9:1	9:6	7:4	*	16:1	8:2	6	0	12	115,01	1
A6	Tomsk	Evgeniy Burmistrov	2:13	1:13	4:8	2:12	1:16	*	3:12	0	6	6	166,09	7
A7	Krasnoyarsk Krai	Sergey Rylnikov	5:7	4:13	3:13	10:5	2:8	12:3	*	2	4	8	165,96	5

=== Group B ===
	Team	Skip	B1	B2	B3	B4	B5	B6	Wins	Losses	Points	DSC, cm	Place
B1	Rodnik	Andrey Smirnov	*	10:6	9:4	8:4	8:9	2:7	3	2	8	113,84	3
B2	Team Sergiyev Posad	Sergey Mishin	6:10	*	9:6	7:5	2:6	3:7	2	3	7	144,36	4
B3	Udmurtia	Aleksandr Zhuravlyov	4:9	6:9	*	5:14	3:10	1:9	0	5	5	135,64	6
B4	Sevastopol	Vladimir Lyubovich	4:8	5:7	14:5	*	3:8	7:5	2	3	7	181,36	5
B5	Moscow Oblast	Valeriy Ulianov	9:8	6:2	10:3	8:3	*	8:7	5	0	10	136,72	1
B6	Adamant	Alexey Lyubimtsev	7:2	7:3	9:1	5:7	7:8	*	3	2	8	107,47	2

Teams to semi-finals
Teams to quarterfinals (Qualification games 2nd round)
Teams to 1/8 finals (Qualification games 1st round)
Points: 2 for win, 1 for loss, 0 for technical loss (did not start)

== Playoffs ==
1/8 finals (Qualification games 1st round)
1
16
9
8
5
12
A-3	Granit	12
B-4	Team Sergiyev Posad	1
3
14
11
6
7
10
B-3	Rodnik	15
A-4	Samara Oblast	0

Quarterfinals (Qualification games 2nd round)
B-2	Adamant	2
Granit	6
A-2	Krasnodar Krai	3
Rodnik	7

Semi-finals
A-1	Moscow	6
Granit	3
B-1	Moscow Oblast	5
Rodnik	7

Final
Moscow	9
Rodnik	6
Third place
Granit	7
Moscow Oblast	10

1/8 finals (Qualification games 1st round)
March 21, 14:30

Sheet 1	1	2	3	4	5	6	7	8	Final
Granit	2	1	0	6	1	2	Х	Х	12
Team Sergiyev Posad	0	0	1	0	0	0	Х	Х	1

Sheet 3	1	2	3	4	5	6	7	8	Final
Rodnik	5	1	2	3	3	1	Х	Х	15
Samara Oblast	0	0	0	0	0	0	Х	Х	0

Game for 9th place
March 21, 14:30

Sheet 4	1	2	3	4	5	6	7	8	Final
Krasnoyarsk Krai	1	4	0	1	2	1	Х	Х	9
Sevastopol	0	0	1	0	0	0	Х	Х	1

Game for 11th place
March 21, 14:30

Sheet 2	1	2	3	4	5	6	7	8	Final
Novosibirsk Oblast	0	0	0	0	2	2	1	1	6
Udmurtia	1	1	1	1	0	0	0	0	4

Quarterfinals (Qualification games 2nd round)
March 21, 18:30

Sheet 1	1	2	3	4	5	6	7	8	Final
Rodnik	0	2	0	2	0	0	3	Х	7
Krasnodar Krai	1	0	1	0	0	1	0	Х	3

Sheet 2	1	2	3	4	5	6	7	8	Final
Granit	1	0	1	1	2	1	0	Х	6
Adamant	0	1	0	0	0	0	1	Х	2

Game for 5th place
March 22, 10:30

Sheet 2	1	2	3	4	5	6	7	8	Final
Adamant	0	3	2	0	1	0	3	0	9
Krasnodar Krai	1	0	0	2	0	3	0	1	7

Game for 7th place
March 22, 10:30

Sheet 1	1	2	3	4	5	6	7	8	Final
Samara Oblast	0	2	0	2	2	1	0	Х	7
Team Sergiyev Posad	3	0	3	0	0	0	3	Х	9

Semi-finals
March 22, 10:30

Sheet 3	1	2	3	4	5	6	7	8	Final
Granit	0	0	2	0	1	0	0	Х	3
Moscow	0	1	0	2	0	2	1	Х	6

Sheet 4	1	2	3	4	5	6	7	8	Final
Rodnik	0	0	1	0	1	0	5	Х	7
Moscow Oblast	1	1	0	1	0	2	0	Х	5

Bronze medal game
March 22, 15:30

Sheet 1	1	2	3	4	5	6	7	8	Final
Granit	2	0	2	0	0	1	2	0	7
Moscow Oblast	0	2	0	2	1	0	0	5	10

Final
March 22, 15:30

Sheet 2	1	2	3	4	5	6	7	8	Final
Rodnik	0	0	0	0	3	3	0	Х	6
Moscow	2	1	1	4	0	0	1	Х	9

== Final standings ==
Place	Team	Skip	Games played	Wins	Losses
1st place, gold medalist(s)	Moscow	Andrei Meshcheryakov	8	8	0
2nd place, silver medalist(s)	Rodnik (Sverdlovsk Oblast)	Andrey Smirnov	9	6	3
3rd place, bronze medalist(s)	Moscow Oblast	Valeriy Ulianov	7	6	1
4	Granit (Chelyabinsk Oblast)	Aleksey Fatuyev	10	6	4
5	Adamant (Saint Petersburg)	Alexey Lyubimtsev	7	4	3
6	Krasnodar Krai	Aleksey Golivko	8	5	3
7	Team Sergiyev Posad (Moscow Oblast)	Sergey Mishin	7	3	4
8	Samara Oblast	Vasiliy Petin	8	3	5
9	Krasnoyarsk Krai	Sergey Rylnikov	7	3	4
10	Sevastopol	Vladimir Lyubovich	6	2	4
11	Novosibirsk Oblast	Vasiliy Ryazantsev	7	2	5
12	Udmurtia	Aleksandr Zhuravlyov	6	0	6
13	Tomsk	Evgeniy Burmistrov	6	0	6

== See also ==
- 2020 Russian Men's Curling Championship
- 2020 Russian Women's Curling Championship
- 2020 Russian Mixed Curling Championship
- 2020 Russian Mixed Doubles Curling Championship
- 2020 Russian Junior Curling Championships
