= Geir Arne Skogstad =

Norwegian wheelchair curler and ice sledge hockey player

- Curler
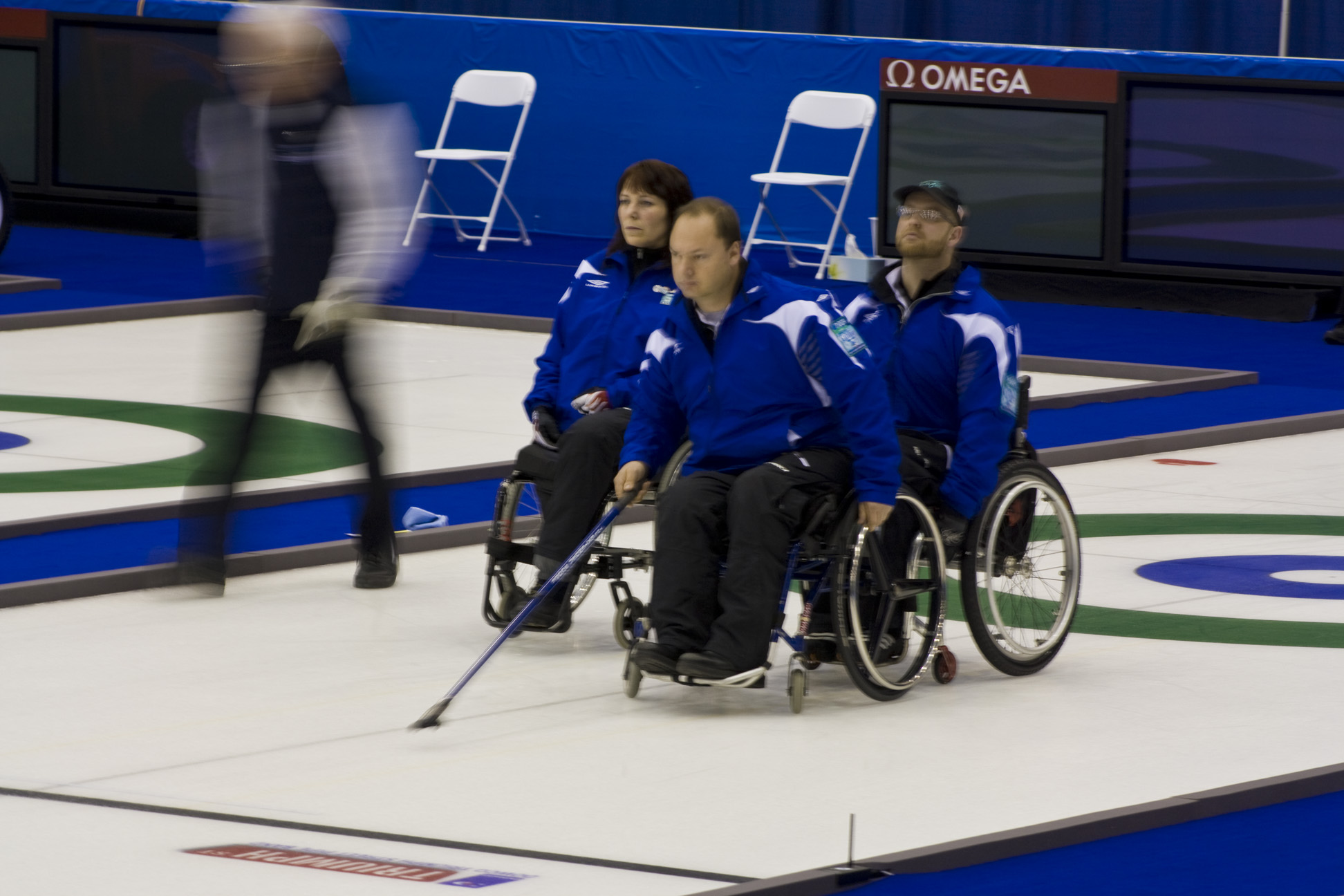
- Born: 9 December 1973 (age 52); Trondheim, Norway

Team
- Curling club: Trondheim Curlingklubb, Trondheim

Curling career
- Member Association: Norway
- World Wheelchair Championship: 10 (2004, 2005, 2007, 2008, 2009, 2020, 2021, 2023, 2024, 2025)
- World Wheelchair Mixed Doubles Championship: 1 (2025)
- Paralympic: 5 (2002, 2006, 2010, 2022, 2026)
Medal record
Wheelchair curling
World Wheelchair Championship
Gold medal – first place	2007 Sollefteå
Gold medal – first place	2008 Sursee
Gold medal – first place	2024 Gangneung
Para ice hockey
Winter Paralympics
Silver medal – second place	2002 Salt Lake City
World Championships
Gold medal – first place	2004 Örnsköldsvik
Silver medal – second place	2000 Utah

Geir Arne Skogstad (born 9 December 1973) is a Norwegian wheelchair curler and ice sledge hockey (para ice hockey) player.

== Career ==
As a member of the Norwegian ice sledge hockey team he participated at the 2002 Paralympic Games where the Norwegian team won a silver medal.

As a wheelchair curler, he participated at the 2006, 2010 and 2022 Winter Paralympics.

== Teams ==
=== Wheelchair ===
Season	Skip	Third	Second	Lead	Alternate	Coach	Events
2003–04	Paul Aksel Johansen	Geir Arne Skogstad	Lene Tystad	Trine Fissum		Gry Roaldseth	WWhCC 2004 (12th)
2004–05	Paul Aksel Johansen	Geir Arne Skogstad	Lene Tystad	Trine Fissum	Rune Lorentsen	Ingrid Claussen	WWhCC 2005 (5th)
2005–06	Geir Arne Skogstad	Rune Lorentsen	Paul Aksel Johansen	Trine Fissum	Lene Tystad		WPG 2006 (4th)
2006–07	Rune Lorentsen	Geir Arne Skogstad	Jostein Stordahl	Lene Tystad	Trine Fissum	Thoralf Hognestad	WWhCC 2007 (gold)
2007–08	Rune Lorentsen	Jostein Stordahl	Geir Arne Skogstad	Lene Tystad	Anne Mette Samdal	Thoralf Hognestad	WWhCC 2008 (gold)
2008–09	Rune Lorentsen	Geir Arne Skogstad	Jostein Stordahl	Anne Mette Samdal	Lene Tystad	Thoralf Hognestad	WWhCC 2009 (7th)
2009–10	Rune Lorentsen	Jostein Stordahl	Geir Arne Skogstad	Lene Tystad	Anne Mette Samdal	Per Christensen	WPG 2010 (9th)
2019–20	Jostein Stordahl	Ole Fredrik Syversen	Geir Arne Skogstad	Sissel Løchen	Rikke Iversen	Peter Dahlman	WWhCC 2020 (5th)
2020–21	Jostein Stordahl	Ole Fredrik Syversen	Geir Arne Skogstad	Sissel Løchen	Mia Larsen Sveberg	Peter Dahlman	WWhCC 2021 (7th)
2021–22	Jostein Stordahl	Ole Fredrik Syversen	Geir Arne Skogstad	Sissel Løchen	Mia Larsen Sveberg	Peter Dahlman	WPG 2022 (7th)
2022–23	Jostein Stordahl	Ole Fredrik Syversen	Geir Arne Skogstad	Mia Larsen Sveberg	Ingrid Djupskås	Peter Dahlman	WWhCC 2023 (7th)
2023–24	Jostein Stordahl	Ole Fredrik Syversen	Geir Arne Skogstad	Mia Larsen Sveberg	Ingrid Djupskås	Peter Dahlman	WWhCC 2024 (gold)
2024–25	Jostein Stordahl	Ole Fredrik Syversen	Geir Arne Skogstad	Mia Larsen Sveberg	Ingrid Djupskås	Peter Dahlman	WWhCC 2025 (6th)

=== Men's ===
Season	Skip	Third	Second	Lead	Events
2018–19	Bjørn Tore Elvevold	Sigmund Ellingsen	Frode Storheil	Geir Arne Skogstad	NMCC 2019 (13th)
