= Victor Ershov =

Russian wheelchair curler (born 1958)

- Curler ♂
- Born: 18 June 1958 (age 68)

Team
- Curling club: Rodnik CC (Yekaterinburg)

Curling career
- Member Association: Russia
- World Wheelchair Championship: 3 (2004, 2005, 2007)
Medal record
Wheelchair curling
Russian Wheelchair Curling Championship
Silver medal – second place	2015 Dmitrov
Silver medal – second place	2020 Novosibirsk
Bronze medal – third place	2012 Dmitrov
Bronze medal – third place	2014 Izhevsk

Victor Arkadyevich Ershov (Russian: Ви́ктор Арка́дьевич Ершо́в; born 18 June 1958) is a Russian wheelchair curler.

One of co-founders of Curling Federation of Sverdlovsk Oblast (Russian: Федерация кёрлинга Свердловской области, 2013).

== Teams ==
Season	Skip	Third	Second	Lead	Alternate	Coach	Events
2003–04	Victor Ershov	Valeriy Chepilko	Andrey Smirnov	Oxana Slesarenko	Nikolay Melnikov	Oleg Narinyan	WWhCC 2004 (9th)
2004–05	Victor Ershov	Andrey Smirnov	Nikolay Melnikov	Oxana Slesarenko	Valeriy Chepilko	Oleg Narinyan	WWhCC 2005 (15th)
2006–07	Victor Ershov	Andrey Smirnov	Oxana Slesarenko	Nikolay Melnikov	Valeriy Chepilko	Vladimir Zubkov	WWhCQ 2006 (gold)
2006–07	Nikolay Melnikov	Andrey Smirnov	Valeriy Chepilko	Oxana Slesarenko	Victor Ershov	Oleg Narinyan	WWhCC 2007 (8th)
2009–10	Andrey Smirnov	Oxana Slesarenko	Ivan Spiridonov	Nikolay Melnikov	Victor Ershov		RWhCC 2010 (4th)
2011–12	Andrey Smirnov	Oxana Slesarenko	Olga Strepetova	Anton Zyapaev	Victor Ershov		RWhCC 2012 (bronze)
2012–13	Andrey Smirnov	Oxana Slesarenko	Olga Strepetova	Victor Ershov			RWhCC 2013 (5th)
2013–14	Andrey Smirnov	Oxana Slesarenko	Olga Strepetova	Nikolay Melnikov	Victor Ershov		RWhCC 2014 (bronze)
2014–15	Andrey Smirnov	Oxana Slesarenko	Olga Strepetova	Evgeny Pinzhenin	Victor Ershov		RWhCC 2015 (silver)
2019–20	Andrey Smirnov	Oxana Slesarenko	Oleg Perminov	Olga Rashchektaeva	Victor Ershov		RWhCC 2020 (silver)
