= Trine Fissum =

Norwegian wheelchair curler

- Curler ♀
- Born: 18 April 1970 (age 56); Trondheim

Team
- Curling club: Trondheim Curlingklubb, Trondheim

Curling career
- Member Association: Norway
- World Wheelchair Championship: 3 (2004, 2005, 2007)
- Paralympic: 1 (2006)
Medal record
Wheelchair curling
World Wheelchair Championship
Gold medal – first place	2007 Sollefteå

Trine Fissum (born 18 April 1970 in Trondheim) is a Norwegian wheelchair curler.

She participated at the 2006 Winter Paralympics where Norwegian team finished on fourth place.

She is a 2007 World wheelchair champion curler.

== Wheelchair curling teams and events ==
Season	Skip	Third	Second	Lead	Alternate	Coach	Events
2003–04	Paul Aksel Johansen	Geir Arne Skogstad	Lene Tystad	Trine Fissum		Gry Roaldseth	WWhCC 2004 (12th)
2004–05	Paul Aksel Johansen	Geir Arne Skogstad	Lene Tystad	Trine Fissum	Rune Lorentsen	Ingrid Claussen	WWhCC 2005 (5th)
2005–06	Geir Arne Skogstad	Rune Lorentsen	Paul Aksel Johansen	Trine Fissum	Lene Tystad		WPG 2006 (4th)
2006–07	Rune Lorentsen	Geir Arne Skogstad	Jostein Stordahl	Lene Tystad	Trine Fissum	Thoralf Hognestad	WWhCC 2007 (gold)
