= Missy Keiser =

American wheelchair curler

- Curler ♀

Curling career
- Member Association: United States
- World Wheelchair Championship: 1 (2005)
Medal record
Wheelchair curling

Melissa "Missy" Keiser is an American wheelchair curler.

At the national level, she is a 2005 United States wheelchair curling champions curler.

== Teams ==
| Season | Skip | Third | Second | Lead | Alternate | Coach | Events |
|---|---|---|---|---|---|---|---|
| 2004–05 | Mark Taylor | James Pierce | James Joseph | Missy Keiser | Bob Prenoveau | Bill Rotton, Diane Brown | WWhCC 2005 (8th) |
