= Clark Shiels =

Welsh wheelchair curler

- Curler ♂
- Born: 28 September 1989 (age 37)

Curling career
- Member Association: Wales
- World Wheelchair Championship: 2 (2004, 2005)
Medal record
Wheelchair curling

Clark Shiels (born 28 September 1989) is a Welsh wheelchair curler.

== Teams ==
Season	Skip	Third	Second	Lead	Alternate	Coach	Events
2003–04	Mike Preston	Ian Jones	Clark Shiels	Marion Harrison		John Stone	WWhCC 2004 (13th)
2004–05	Mike Preston	Clark Shiels	Ian Jones	Marion Harrison	Peter Knapper	John Stone	WWhCC 2005 (11th)
2006–07	Mike Preston	Clark Shiels	Peter Knapper	Marion Harrison	Allan Young	John Stone	WWhCQ 2006 (9th)
