= Slesarenko =

Slesarenko is a Ukrainian-language patronymic surname. Notable people with the surname include:

- Oxana Slesarenko, Russian wheelchair curler
- Yelena Slesarenko, Russian high jumper
