= Anna Karpushina =

Russian wheelchair curler

Anna Karpushina А́нна Карпу́шина
- Curler ♀
- Born: 11 February 1982 (age 44)

Team
- Curling club: Adamant CC, Saint Petersburg, RUS

Curling career
- Member Association: Russia
- World Wheelchair Championship: 1 (2020)
Medal record
Wheelchair curling
World Wheelchair Championship
Gold medal – first place	2020 Wetzikon

Anna Vladimirovna Karpushina (Russian: А́нна Влади́мировна Карпу́шина; born 11 February 1982) is a Russian wheelchair curler, 2020 World champion.

Master of Sports of Russia (2014).

She is the first World wheelchair curling champion from Saint Petersburg and the first wheelchair curler from Saint Petersburg in Russian national team.

== Teams ==
=== Mixed ===
Season	Skip	Third	Second	Lead	Alternate	Coach	Events
2012–13	Anna Karpushina	?	?	?			RWhCC 2013 (silver)
2016–17	Anna Karpushina	?	?	?			RWhCC 2017 (4th)
2018–19	Nikolay Yakushkin	Alexey Lyubimtsev	Denis Zinoviev	Anna Karpushina	Maxim Zagorsky	Petr Dron, Anna Karpushina, Nikolai Cherednichenko	RWhCC 2019 (7th)
2019–20	Nikolay Yakushkin (fourth)	Alexey Lyubimtsev (skip)	Denis Zinoviev	Anna Karpushina	Maxim Zagorsky		RWhCC 2020 (5th)
2019–20	Konstantin Kurokhtin	Andrei Meshcheriakov	Vitaly Danilov	Daria Shchukina	Anna Karpushina	Anton Batugin, Sergey Shamov	WWhCC 2020 (gold)

=== Mixed doubles ===
Season	Female	Male	Coach	Events
2023–24	Anna Karpushina	Alexey Lyubimtsev	Igor Badilin	RWhMDCC 2024 (bronze)
2024–25	Anna Karpushina	Alexey Lyubimtsev	Igor Badilin	RWhMDCCup 2024 (silver)
