= Ian Jones (curler) =

Welsh wheelchair curler

- Curler ♂
- Born: 25 December 1968 (age 57)

Curling career
- Member Association: Wales
- World Wheelchair Championship: 2 (2004, 2005)
Medal record
Wheelchair curling

Ian Jones (born 25 December 1968) is a Welsh wheelchair curler.

== Teams ==
Season	Skip	Third	Second	Lead	Alternate	Coach	Events
2003–04	Mike Preston	Ian Jones	Clark Shiels	Marion Harrison		John Stone	WWhCC 2004 (13th)
2004–05	Mike Preston	Clark Shiels	Ian Jones	Marion Harrison	Peter Knapper	John Stone	WWhCC 2005 (11th)
