= Vitaly Danilov =

Russian wheelchair curler

Vitaly Danilov Вита́лий Дани́лов
- Curler ♂
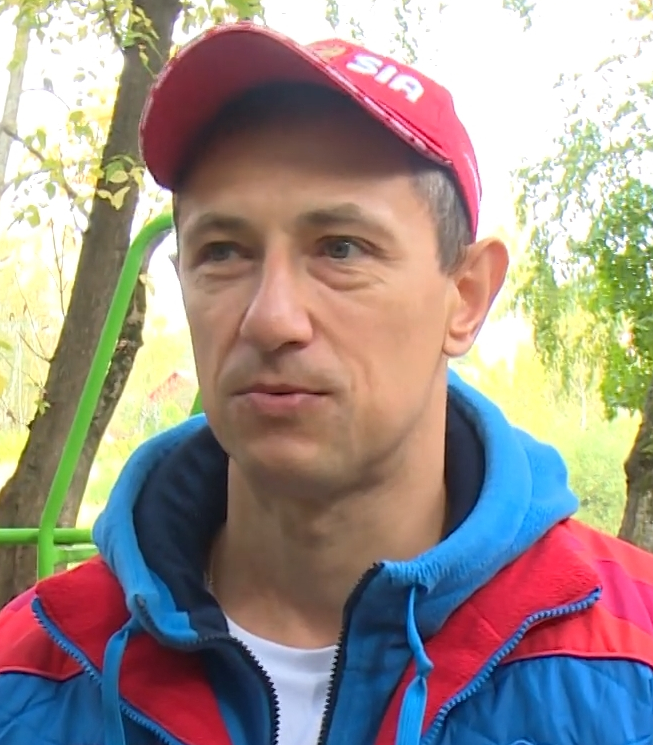
- Vitaly Danilov in September 2020
- Born: 12 June 1980 (age 46); Shchyolkovo, Moscow Oblast, RSFSR, Soviet Union

Curling career
- Member Association: Russia
- World Wheelchair Championship: 1 (2020)
Medal record
Wheelchair curling
World Wheelchair Championship
Gold medal – first place	2020 Wetzikon
Russian Wheelchair Curling Championship
Bronze medal – third place	2020 Novosibirsk

Vitaly Vladimirovich Danilov (Russian: Вита́лий Влади́мирович Дани́лов; born 12 June 1980 in Shchyolkovo, Moscow Oblast, Russia) is a Russian wheelchair curler, 2020 World champion.

== Teams ==
Season	Skip	Third	Second	Lead	Alternate	Coach	Events
2019–20	Valeriy Ulianov	Vitaly Danilov	Vladislav Makarov	Rimma Mambetkarimova			RWhCC 2020 (bronze)
2019–20	Konstantin Kurokhtin	Andrei Meshcheriakov	Vitaly Danilov	Daria Shchukina	Anna Karpushina	Anton Batugin, Sergey Shamov	WWhCC 2020 (gold)
