= Mike Preston (curler) =

Welsh wheelchair curler (1944–2009)

- Curler ♂
- Born: 16 May 1944
- Died: 10 July 2009 (aged 65)

Team
- Curling club: The First Province of Wales

Curling career
- Member Association: Wales
- World Wheelchair Championship: 2 (2004, 2005)
Medal record
Wheelchair curling

Mike Preston (16 May 1944 – 10 July 2009) was a Welsh wheelchair curler.

== Teams ==
Season	Skip	Third	Second	Lead	Alternate	Coach	Events
2003–04	Mike Preston	Ian Jones	Clark Shiels	Marion Harrison		John Stone	WWhCC 2004 (13th)
2004–05	Mike Preston	Clark Shiels	Ian Jones	Marion Harrison	Peter Knapper	John Stone	WWhCC 2005 (11th)
2006–07	Mike Preston	Clark Shiels	Peter Knapper	Marion Harrison	Allan Young	John Stone	WWhCQ 2006 (9th)
2008–09	Mike Preston	William Bell	Allan Young	Marion Harrison	Valerie Prydderch	John Stone	WWhCQ 2008 (9th)
