= 2005 World Wheelchair Curling Championship =

- Host city: Braehead, Scotland
- Dates: January 17–22
- Winner: Scotland
- Skip: Frank Duffy
- Third: Michael McCreadie
- Second: Tom Killin
- Lead: Angie Malone
- Alternate: Ken Dickson
- Coach: Jane Sanderson
- Finalist: Denmark (Kenneth Ørbæk)

The 2005 World Wheelchair Curling Championship was held from January 17 to 22 in Braehead, Glasgow, Scotland.

== Teams ==
=== Group A ===
Denmark	England	Japan	Norway
Skip: Kenneth Ørbæk Third: Rosita Jensen; Second: Jørn Kristensen; Lead: Bjarne Jensen; Alternate: Sussie Pedersen; Coach: Per Christensen	Skip: George Windram Third: Ian Wakenshaw; Second: Dave Quarrie; Lead: Valerie Robertson; Alternate: Garry Robson; Coach: Joan Reed	Skip: Yoji Nakajima Third: Katsuo Ichikawa; Second: Takashi Hidai; Lead: Ayako Saitoh; Alternate: Toru Utumi; Coach: Kumiko Ogihara	Skip: Paul Aksel Johansen Third: Geir Arne Skogstad; Second: Lene Tystad; Lead: Trine Fissum; Alternate: Rune Lorentsen; Coach: Ingrid Claussen
Russia	Scotland	United States	Wales
Skip: Victor Ershov Third: Andrey Smirnov; Second: Nikolay Melnikov; Lead: Oxana Slesarenko; Alternate: Valeriy Chepilko; Coach: Oleg Narinyan	Skip: Frank Duffy Third: Michael McCreadie; Second: Tom Killin; Lead: Angie Malone; Alternate: Ken Dickson; Coach: Jane Sanderson	Skip: Mark Taylor Third: James Pierce; Second: James Joseph; Lead: Missy Keiser; Alternate: Bob Prenoveau; Coach: Bill Rotton, Diane Brown	Skip: Mike Preston Third: Clark Shiels; Second: Ian Jones; Lead: Marion Harrison; Alternate: Peter Knapper; Coach: John Stone

=== Group B ===
Bulgaria	Canada	Germany	Italy
Skip: Ivan Shopov Third: Svetozar Kirov; Second: Rumen Panayotov; Lead: Neli Sabeva; Alternate: Stela Eneva; Coach: Dimitar Dimitrov	Skip: Chris Daw Third: Bruce McAninch; Second: Jim Primavera; Lead: Karen Blachford; Alternate: Gerry Austgarden; Coach: Amy Reid, Joe Rea	Skip: Jens Jäger Third: Jens Gäbel; Second: Christian Conrad; Lead: Inge Wenzler; Alternate: Jürgen Sommer; Coach: Bernd Weisser, Katja Weisser	Skip: Egidio Marchese Third: Orazio Fagone; Second: Lucrezia Celentano; Lead: Danilo Destro; Alternate: Pierino Gaspard; Coach: Mauro Maino
Poland	South Korea	Sweden	Switzerland
Skip: Eugeniusz Blaszczak Third: Arkadiusz Pawlowski; Second: Ireneusz Jonski; Lead: Magdalena Karlewska; Alternate: Katarzyna Bielawska; Coach: Arkadiusz Detyniecki	Skip: Kim Hak-sung Third: Kim Myung-jin; Second: Cho Yang-hyun; Lead: Cho Yae-lee; Alternate: Ham Dong-hee; Coach: Kim Chang-gyu	Skip: Jalle Jungnell Third: Glenn Ikonen; Second: Rolf Johansson; Lead: Anette Wilhelm; Alternate: Bernt Sjöberg; Coach: Olle Brudsten, Thomas Wilhelm	Skip: Urs Bucher Third: Manfred Bolliger; Second: Cesare Cassani; Lead: Therese Kämpfer; Alternate: Erwin Lauper; Coach: Urs Keller

== Round-robin standings ==
Key
Teams to Playoffs

Group A	Skip	W	L
Scotland	Frank Duffy	7	0
Denmark	Kenneth Ørbæk	5	2
Norway	Paul Aksel Johansen	4	3
United States	Mark Taylor	3	4
England	George Windram	3	4
Wales	Mike Preston	2	5
Japan	Yoji Nakajima	2	5
Russia	Victor Ershov	2	5

Group B	Skip	W	L
Sweden	Jalle Jungnell	6	1
Switzerland	Urs Bucher	6	1
Canada	Chris Daw	5	2
South Korea	Kim Hak-sung	5	2
Italy	Egidio Marchese	3	4
Bulgaria	Ivan Shopov	2	5
Germany	Jens Jäger	1	6
Poland	Eugeniusz Blaszczak	0	7

== Round-robin results ==
=== Group A ===
==== Draw 1 ====
Monday, January 17, 13:30

Sheet A	1	2	3	4	5	6	Final
Scotland (Duffy) 🔨	3	2	2	0	0	3	10
Japan (Nakajima)	0	0	0	1	1	0	2

Sheet B	1	2	3	4	5	6	Final
England (Windram) 🔨	1	1	2	0	1	0	5
Wales (Preston)	0	0	0	2	0	1	3

Sheet C	1	2	3	4	5	6	EE	Final
United States (Taylor) 🔨	0	0	4	0	0	1	0	5
Norway (Johansen)	1	1	0	1	2	0	1	6

Sheet D	1	2	3	4	5	6	Final
Denmark (Ørbæk) 🔨	1	3	1	0	3	0	8
Russia (Ershov)	0	0	0	2	0	2	4

==== Draw 2 ====
Tuesday, January 18, 9:30

Sheet A	1	2	3	4	5	6	Final
Norway (Johansen)	0	0	3	0	1	0	4
Russia (Ershov) 🔨	2	1	0	1	0	1	5

Sheet B	1	2	3	4	5	6	Final
United States (Taylor) 🔨	0	0	1	0	1	0	2
Denmark (Ørbæk)	1	1	0	3	0	1	6

Sheet C	1	2	3	4	5	6	Final
Japan (Nakajima) 🔨	0	0	0	1	1	1	3
Wales (Preston)	1	1	2	0	0	0	4

Sheet D	1	2	3	4	5	6	Final
Scotland (Duffy)	0	0	1	0	2	1	4
England (Windram)	1	1	0	1	0	0	3

==== Draw 3 ====
Tuesday, January 18, 16:30

Sheet A	1	2	3	4	5	6	EE	Final
United States (Taylor)	0	2	1	0	1	0	1	5
Wales (Preston) 🔨	2	0	0	1	0	1	0	4

Sheet B	1	2	3	4	5	6	EE	Final
Scotland (Duffy)	2	0	3	0	1	0	1	7
Russia (Ershov) 🔨	0	3	0	2	0	1	0	6

Sheet C	1	2	3	4	5	6	Final
Denmark (Ørbæk) 🔨	1	2	2	0	0	2	7
England (Windram)	0	0	0	1	1	0	2

Sheet D	1	2	3	4	5	6	Final
Japan (Nakajima)	0	0	1	0	0	1	2
Norway (Johansen) 🔨	1	1	0	2	1	0	5

==== Draw 4 ====
Wednesday, January 19, 9:30

Sheet A	1	2	3	4	5	6	EE	Final
England (Windram) 🔨	0	0	1	0	2	1	0	4
Norway (Johansen)	1	1	0	2	0	0	1	5

Sheet B	1	2	3	4	5	6	Final
Denmark (Ørbæk)	0	1	2	0	1	0	4
Japan (Nakajima) 🔨	2	0	0	4	0	1	7

Sheet C	1	2	3	4	5	6	Final
Scotland (Duffy) 🔨	1	0	0	1	2	2	6
United States (Taylor)	0	3	1	0	0	0	4

Sheet D	1	2	3	4	5	6	Final
Russia (Ershov)	0	0	3	0	0	0	3
Wales (Preston) 🔨	2	1	0	1	2	1	7

==== Draw 5 ====
Wednesday, January 19, 16:30

Sheet A	1	2	3	4	5	6	Final
Denmark (Ørbæk) 🔨	1	0	1	0	1	0	3
Scotland (Duffy)	0	3	0	2	0	2	7

Sheet B	1	2	3	4	5	6	Final
Wales (Preston)	0	1	0	1	1	0	3
Norway (Johansen) 🔨	3	0	1	0	0	1	5

Sheet C	1	2	3	4	5	6	Final
England (Windram)	2	0	0	1	0	3	6
Russia (Ershov) 🔨	0	3	1	0	1	0	5

Sheet D	1	2	3	4	5	6	Final
United States (Taylor) 🔨	2	1	0	1	2	0	6
Japan (Nakajima)	0	0	3	0	0	2	5

==== Draw 6 ====
Thursday, January 20, 9:30

Sheet A	1	2	3	4	5	6	Final
Japan (Nakajima)	0	3	0	2	0	0	5
England (Windram) 🔨	2	0	1	0	1	3	7

Sheet B	1	2	3	4	5	6	Final
Russia (Ershov) 🔨	1	0	1	2	0	1	5
United States (Taylor)	0	1	0	0	1	0	2

Sheet C	1	2	3	4	5	6	Final
Wales (Preston)	0	0	0	1	0	0	1
Scotland (Duffy) 🔨	2	1	2	0	1	1	7

Sheet D	1	2	3	4	5	6	Final
Norway (Johansen)	4	0	0	0	0	0	4
Denmark (Ørbæk) 🔨	0	3	1	1	4	2	11

==== Draw 7 ====
Thursday, January 20, 16:30

Sheet A	1	2	3	4	5	6	Final
Wales (Preston) 🔨	2	0	0	0	0	X	2
Denmark (Ørbæk)	0	6	4	2	1	X	13

Sheet B	1	2	3	4	5	6	Final
Norway (Johansen) 🔨	0	3	0	0	0	0	3
Scotland (Duffy)	1	0	3	1	1	3	9

Sheet C	1	2	3	4	5	6	Final
Russia (Ershov)	2	0	0	0	0	2	4
Japan (Nakajima) 🔨	0	1	1	4	1	0	7

Sheet D	1	2	3	4	5	6	Final
England (Windram) 🔨	1	0	0	0	2	0	3
United States (Taylor)	0	4	3	1	0	2	10

=== Group B ===
==== Draw 1 ====
Monday, January 17, 17:00

Sheet A	1	2	3	4	5	6	Final
Switzerland (Bucher) 🔨	2	1	1	0	5	5	14
Poland (Blaszczak)	0	0	0	1	0	0	1

Sheet B	1	2	3	4	5	6	Final
Canada (Daw) 🔨	1	2	1	0	0	1	5
Germany (Jäger)	0	0	0	1	1	0	2

Sheet C	1	2	3	4	5	6	Final
Italy (Marchese) 🔨	0	0	0	0	0	0	0
South Korea (Kim)	3	1	1	1	3	1	10

Sheet D	1	2	3	4	5	6	Final
Sweden (Jungnell) 🔨	0	1	4	0	0	1	6
Bulgaria (Shopov)	1	0	0	1	1	0	3

==== Draw 2 ====
Tuesday, January 18, 13:00

Sheet A	1	2	3	4	5	6	Final
South Korea (Kim)	0	1	1	3	2	0	7
Bulgaria (Shopov) 🔨	1	0	0	0	0	3	4

Sheet B	1	2	3	4	5	6	Final
Italy (Marchese) 🔨	0	2	0	2	1	0	5
Sweden (Jungnell)	2	0	5	0	0	1	8

Sheet C	1	2	3	4	5	6	EE	Final
Poland (Blaszczak) 🔨	0	2	1	1	0	0	0	4
Germany (Jäger)	1	0	0	0	2	1	2	6

Sheet D	1	2	3	4	5	6	Final
Switzerland (Bucher) 🔨	0	1	3	4	0	3	11
Canada (Daw)	2	0	0	0	1	0	3

==== Draw 3 ====
Tuesday, January 18, 20:00

Sheet A	1	2	3	4	5	6	Final
Italy (Marchese)	0	5	1	3	2	0	11
Germany (Jäger) 🔨	1	0	0	0	0	1	2

Sheet B	1	2	3	4	5	6	Final
Switzerland (Bucher)	0	0	4	2	3	1	10
Bulgaria (Shopov) 🔨	2	1	0	0	0	0	3

Sheet C	1	2	3	4	5	6	Final
Sweden (Jungnell) 🔨	2	0	1	2	1	1	7
Canada (Daw)	0	1	0	0	0	0	1

Sheet D	1	2	3	4	5	6	Final
Poland (Blaszczak)	0	0	0	0	0	0	0
South Korea (Kim) 🔨	1	1	2	3	2	1	10

==== Draw 4 ====
Wednesday, January 19, 13:00

Sheet A	1	2	3	4	5	6	Final
Canada (Daw) 🔨	3	1	0	1	0	0	5
South Korea (Kim)	0	0	2	0	1	1	4

Sheet B	1	2	3	4	5	6	Final
Sweden (Jungnell)	3	3	0	1	1	0	8
Poland (Blaszczak) 🔨	0	0	2	0	0	1	3

Sheet C	1	2	3	4	5	6	Final
Switzerland (Bucher) 🔨	1	1	0	3	2	2	9
Italy (Marchese)	0	0	2	0	0	0	2

Sheet D	1	2	3	4	5	6	Final
Bulgaria (Shopov)	1	1	0	2	0	2	6
Germany (Jäger) 🔨	0	0	1	0	1	0	2

==== Draw 5 ====
Wednesday, January 19, 20:00

Sheet A	1	2	3	4	5	6	Final
Sweden (Jungnell) 🔨	2	2	0	0	1	0	5
Switzerland (Bucher)	0	0	1	2	0	1	4

Sheet B	1	2	3	4	5	6	Final
Germany (Jäger)	0	0	0	1	0	1	2
South Korea (Kim) 🔨	1	1	3	0	2	0	7

Sheet C	1	2	3	4	5	6	Final
Canada (Daw)	0	0	3	3	0	0	6
Bulgaria (Shopov) 🔨	1	1	0	0	1	1	4

Sheet D	1	2	3	4	5	6	Final
Italy (Marchese) 🔨	4	2	3	1	0	2	12
Poland (Blaszczak)	0	0	0	0	2	0	2

==== Draw 6 ====
Thursday, January 20, 13:00

Sheet A	1	2	3	4	5	6	Final
Poland (Blaszczak)	0	0	0	2	0	0	2
Canada (Daw) 🔨	2	1	2	0	3	2	10

Sheet B	1	2	3	4	5	6	Final
Bulgaria (Shopov)	0	0	5	1	0	0	6
Italy (Marchese) 🔨	3	2	0	0	3	4	12

Sheet C	1	2	3	4	5	6	Final
Germany (Jäger)	0	2	0	0	1	0	3
Switzerland (Bucher) 🔨	4	0	2	1	0	4	11

Sheet D	1	2	3	4	5	6	Final
South Korea (Kim)	2	0	2	3	3	X	10
Sweden (Jungnell) 🔨	0	2	0	0	0	X	2

==== Draw 7 ====
Thursday, January 20, 20:00

Sheet A	1	2	3	4	5	6	Final
Germany (Jäger) 🔨	0	2	1	0	3	0	6
Sweden (Jungnell)	1	0	0	4	0	2	7

Sheet B	1	2	3	4	5	6	Final
South Korea (Kim) 🔨	1	0	0	0	0	4	5
Switzerland (Bucher)	0	2	2	1	2	0	7

Sheet C	1	2	3	4	5	6	Final
Bulgaria (Shopov)	2	0	2	0	0	2	6
Poland (Blaszczak) 🔨	0	2	0	1	1	0	4

Sheet D	1	2	3	4	5	6	Final
Canada (Daw) 🔨	1	1	0	3	1	0	6
Italy (Marchese)	0	0	1	0	0	1	2

== Playoffs ==
Semifinals
B2	Switzerland	6
A1	Scotland	7
B1	Sweden	1
A2	Denmark	7

Gold Medal Game
A1	Scotland	7
A2	Denmark	6
Bronze Medal Game
B2	Switzerland	10
B1	Sweden	0

=== Semifinals ===
Saturday, January 22, 10:00

Sheet B	1	2	3	4	5	6	EE	Final
Switzerland (Bucher) 🔨	1	1	0	1	0	1	0	4
Scotland (Duffy)	0	0	1	0	3	0	3	7

Sheet D	1	2	3	4	5	6	Final
Sweden (Jungnell)	0	0	0	1	0	0	1
Denmark (Ørbæk) 🔨	1	1	3	0	1	1	7

=== Bronze medal game ===
Saturday, January 22, 14:00

Sheet A	1	2	3	4	5	6	Final
Switzerland (Bucher) 🔨	3	1	3	3	X	X	10
Sweden (Jungnell)	0	0	0	0	X	X	0

=== Gold medal game ===
Saturday, January 22, 14:00

Sheet C	1	2	3	4	5	6	Final
Scotland (Duffy)	0	2	3	0	0	2	7
Denmark (Ørbæk) 🔨	3	0	0	2	1	0	6

2005 World Wheelchair Curling Championship
(Scotland)
Scotland
2nd title
