= Konstantin Kurokhtin =

Russian wheelchair curler (born 1978)

- skip ♂
- Born: 1 July 1978 (age 48); Moscow, RSFSR, Soviet Union

Team
- Curling club: Moskvich (Moscow)

Curling career
- Member Association: Russia
- World Wheelchair Championship: 3 (2016, 2017, 2020)
- Paralympic: 1 (2018)
Medal record
Wheelchair curling
World Wheelchair Championship
Gold medal – first place	2016 Lucerne
Gold medal – first place	2020 Wetzikon
Silver medal – second place	2017 Gangneung

Konstantin Vladimirovich Kurokhtin (Russian: Константи́н Влади́мирович Куро́хтин; born 1 Jule 1978 in Moscow, Russia) is a Russian wheelchair curler playing as skip for the Russian wheelchair curling team. He and his team won gold medals at the World Wheelchair Curling Championships.

== Career ==
Kurokhtin is a member of the local sports club "Moskvich" (Moscow). He participated at the 2018 Winter Paralympics and the 2016, 2017 and 2020 World Wheelchair Curling Championships.

== Teams ==
Season	Skip	Third	Second	Lead	Alternate	Coach	Events
2015–16	Andrey Smirnov	Konstantin Kurokhtin	Svetlana Pakhomova	Alexander Shevchenko	Marat Romanov	Anton Batugin	WWhCC 2016 (gold)
2016–17	Andrey Smirnov	Konstantin Kurokhtin	Alexander Shevchenko	Daria Shchukina	Marat Romanov	Anton Batugin	WWhCC 2017 (silver)
2017–18	Konstantin Kurokhtin	Marat Romanov	Alexander Shevchenko	Daria Shchukina	Andrei Meshcheriakov	Anton Batugin	WPG 2018 (5th)
2019–20	Konstantin Kurokhtin	Andrei Meshcheriakov	Vitaly Danilov	Daria Shchukina	Anna Karpushina	Anton Batugin, Sergey Shamov	WWhCC 2020 (gold)
