= Dave Quarrie =

English wheelchair curler

- Curler ♂

Curling career
- Member Association: England
- World Wheelchair Championship: 1 (2005)
Medal record
Wheelchair curling

Dave Quarrie is an English wheelchair curler.

== Teams ==
Season	Skip	Third	Second	Lead	Alternate	Coach	Events
2004–05	George Windram	Ian Wakenshaw	Dave Quarrie	Valerie Robertson	Garry Robson	Joan Reed	WWhCC 2005 (10th)
2006–07	Ian Wakenshaw	Dave Quarrie	Rosemary Lenton	Valerie Robertson	George Windram	Joan Reed	WWhCQ 2006 (5th)
