= George Windram =

English wheelchair curler

- Curler ♂
- Born: 25 March 1940 (age 86)

Curling career
- Member Association: England
- World Wheelchair Championship: 2 (2004, 2005)
Medal record
Wheelchair curling

George Windram (born 25 March 1940) is an English wheelchair curler.

== Teams ==
Season	Skip	Third	Second	Lead	Alternate	Coach	Events
2003–04	Ian Wakenshaw	Noel Thomas	George Windram	Valerie Robertson		Joan Reed	WWhCC 2004 (4th)
2004–05	George Windram	Ian Wakenshaw	Dave Quarrie	Valerie Robertson	Garry Robson	Joan Reed	WWhCC 2005 (10th)
2006–07	Ian Wakenshaw	Dave Quarrie	Rosemary Lenton	Valerie Robertson	George Windram	Joan Reed	WWhCQ 2006 (5th)
