= Noel Thomas (curler) =

English wheelchair curler

- Curler ♂
- Born: 8 March 1980 (age 46)

Curling career
- Member Association: England
- World Wheelchair Championship: 2 (2002, 2004)
Medal record
Wheelchair curling

Noel Thomas (born 8 March 1980) is an English wheelchair curler.

== Teams ==
| Season | Skip | Third | Second | Lead | Coach | Events |
|---|---|---|---|---|---|---|
| 2001–02 | Ian Wakenshaw | Noel Thomas | Ken Dickson | Ewan Park | Joan Reed | WWhCC 2002 (6th) |
| 2003–04 | Ian Wakenshaw | Noel Thomas | George Windram | Valerie Robertson | Joan Reed | WWhCC 2004 (4th) |
