= Ian Wakenshaw =

English wheelchair curler

- Curler ♂
- Born: 2 February 1950 (age 76)

Curling career
- Member Association: England
- World Wheelchair Championship: 3 (2002, 2004, 2005)
Medal record
Wheelchair curling

Ian Wakenshaw (born 2 February 1950) is an English wheelchair curler.

== Teams ==
Season	Skip	Third	Second	Lead	Alternate	Coach	Events
2001–02	Ian Wakenshaw	Noel Thomas	Ken Dickson	Ewan Park		Joan Reed	WWhCC 2002 (6th)
2003–04	Ian Wakenshaw	Noel Thomas	George Windram	Valerie Robertson		Joan Reed	WWhCC 2004 (4th)
2004–05	George Windram	Ian Wakenshaw	Dave Quarrie	Valerie Robertson	Garry Robson	Joan Reed	WWhCC 2005 (10th)
2006–07	Ian Wakenshaw	Dave Quarrie	Rosemary Lenton	Valerie Robertson	George Windram	Joan Reed	WWhCQ 2006 (5th)
2007–08	Ian Wakenshaw	Garry Robson	Robin Crawford	Valerie Robertson			WWhCQ 2007 (5th)
