= 2020 World Wheelchair Curling Championship =

Curling Championship during pandemic

- Host city: Wetzikon, Switzerland
- Arena: Curling Hall Wetzikon
- Dates: February 29 – March 7
- Winner: Russia
- Skip: Konstantin Kurokhtin
- Third: Andrei Meshcheriakov
- Second: Vitaly Danilov
- Lead: Daria Shchukina
- Alternate: Anna Karpushina
- Finalist: Canada

The 2020 World Wheelchair Curling Championship was held at the Curling Hall Wetzikon in Wetzikon, Switzerland from February 29 to March 7.

In the final, Russia defeated Canada 5–4 with steals in the seventh and eighth ends. It was Russia's fourth gold medal at the Wheelchair Championship. The Canadian team won a medal for the first time since 2013. Sweden stole three in the extra end to defeat defending champions China 5–2 in the bronze medal game.

== Qualification ==
The following nations qualified to participate in the 2020 World Wheelchair Curling Championship:

Event	Vacancies	Qualified
Host nation	1	Switzerland
2019 World Wheelchair Curling Championship	8	China; Estonia; Latvia; Norway; Russia; Scotland; Slovakia; South Korea
2019 World Wheelchair-B Curling Championship	3	Canada; Czech Republic; Sweden
TOTAL	12	

== Teams ==
The teams are listed as follows:

Canada	China	Czech Republic	Estonia
Fourth: Jon Thurston; Third: Ina Forrest; Second: Dennis Thiessen; Skip: Mark Ideson; Alternate: Collinda Joseph; Coach: Wayne Kiel, Michael Lizmore	Skip: Wang Haitao; Third: Chen Jianxin; Second: Liu Wei; Lead: Wang Meng; Alternate: Zhang Mingliang; Coach: Li Jianrui	Fourth: Radek Musílek; Skip: Dana Selnekovičová; Second: Martin Tluk; Lead: Jana Břinčilová; Alternate: Štěpán Beneš; Coach: Vit Nekovarik	Skip: Andrei Koitmäe; Third: Lauri Murasov; Second: Mait Mätas; Lead: Signe Falkenberg; Alternate: Katlin Riidebach; Coach: Erkki Lill, Sulev Lokk
Latvia	Norway	Russia	Scotland
Skip: Poļina Rožkova; Third: Sergejs Djačenko; Second: Agris Lasmans; Lead: Ojārs Briedis; Coach: Arnis Veidemanis, Rihards Jeske	Skip: Jostein Stordahl; Third: Ole Fredrik Syversen; Second: Geir Arne Skogstad; Lead: Sissel Løchen; Alternate: Rikke Iversen; Coach: Peter Dahlman	Skip: Konstantin Kurokhtin; Third: Andrei Meshcheriakov; Second: Vitaly Danilov; Lead: Daria Shchukina; Alternate: Anna Karpushina; Coach: Anton Batugin, Sergey Shamov	Skip: Hugh Nibloe; Third: Robert McPherson; Second: Gary Smith; Lead: Charlotte McKenna; Alternate: Meggan Dawson-Farrell; Coach: Sheila Swan
Slovakia	South Korea	Sweden	Switzerland
Skip: Radoslav Ďuriš; Third: Peter Zaťko; Second: Dušan Pitoňák; Lead: Monika Kunkelová; Alternate: Imrich Lyócsa; Coach: Frantisek Pitonak	Fourth: Yang Hui-tae; Skip: Jung Seung-won; Second: Park Kil-woo; Lead: Bang Min-ja; Alternate: Min Byeong-seok; Coach: Kim Joung-yil, Yoon So-min	Skip: Viljo Petersson-Dahl; Third: Mats-Ola Engborg; Second: Ronny Persson; Lead: Kristina Ulander; Alternate: Zandra Reppe; Coach: Alison Kreviazuk	Skip: Raymond Pfyffer; Third: Hans Burgener; Second: Françoise Jaquerod; Lead: Eric Decorvet; Alternate: Adelah Al Roumi; Coach: Stephan Pfister, Lukas Haggenmacher

== Round-robin standings ==
Final round-robin standings

Key
Teams to Playoffs
Teams relegated to 2020 B Championship

Country	Skip	W	L	W–L
China	Wang Haitao	11	0	–
Sweden	Viljo Petersson-Dahl	9	2	–
Canada	Mark Ideson	7	4	–
Norway	Jostein Stordahl	6	5	1–0
Russia	Konstantin Kurokhtin	6	5	0–1
South Korea	Jung Seung-won	5	6	1–0
Latvia	Poļina Rožkova	5	6	0–1
Slovakia	Radoslav Ďuriš	4	7	1–0
Scotland	Hugh Nibloe	4	7	0–1
Estonia	Andrei Koitmäe	3	8	2–0
Switzerland	Raymond Pfyffer	3	8	1–1
Czech Republic	Dana Selnekovičová	3	8	0–2

== Round-robin results ==
All draws times are listed in Central European Time (UTC+01:00).

=== Draw 1 ===
Saturday, February 29, 2:00 pm

Sheet A	1	2	3	4	5	6	7	8	Final
Estonia (Koitmäe) 🔨	1	0	2	0	0	1	0	0	4
Sweden (Petersson-Dahl)	0	0	0	1	1	0	3	1	6

Sheet B	1	2	3	4	5	6	7	8	Final
Czech Republic (Selnekovičová) 🔨	0	0	0	1	0	3	0	X	4
Latvia (Rožkova)	1	4	1	0	4	0	2	X	12

Sheet C	1	2	3	4	5	6	7	8	Final
Canada (Ideson)	0	0	0	3	1	3	0	X	7
Slovakia (Ďuriš) 🔨	2	1	2	0	0	0	0	X	5

Sheet D	1	2	3	4	5	6	7	8	Final
Russia (Kurokhtin) 🔨	0	1	2	2	0	3	1	X	9
Scotland (Nibloe)	0	0	0	0	3	0	0	X	3

=== Draw 2 ===
Saturday, February 29, 7:00 pm

Sheet A	1	2	3	4	5	6	7	8	Final
South Korea (Jung) 🔨	1	0	0	1	0	0	0	X	2
Norway (Stordahl)	0	2	0	0	2	1	2	X	7

Sheet B	1	2	3	4	5	6	7	8	Final
Slovakia (Ďuriš) 🔨	0	2	0	3	0	2	0	X	7
Scotland (Nibloe)	1	0	1	0	1	0	2	X	5

Sheet C	1	2	3	4	5	6	7	8	Final
China (Wang)	1	0	5	0	0	4	0	X	10
Switzerland (Pfyffer) 🔨	0	1	0	2	1	0	2	X	6

Sheet D	1	2	3	4	5	6	7	8	Final
Latvia (Rožkova)	0	1	0	0	3	1	0	3	8
Estonia (Koitmäe) 🔨	1	0	3	2	0	0	1	0	7

=== Draw 3 ===
Sunday, March 1, 9:00 am

Sheet B	1	2	3	4	5	6	7	8	Final
Canada (Ideson) 🔨	0	0	0	0	1	0	0	X	1
Russia (Kurokhtin)	1	0	1	2	0	2	2	X	8

Sheet C	1	2	3	4	5	6	7	8	Final
Czech Republic (Selnekovičová) 🔨	0	0	0	0	0	1	0	X	1
Sweden (Petersson-Dahl)	1	1	1	1	1	0	1	X	6

=== Draw 4 ===
Sunday, March 1, 2:00 pm

Sheet A	1	2	3	4	5	6	7	8	Final
Scotland (Nibloe)	1	0	2	1	1	2	1	X	8
Switzerland (Pfyffer) 🔨	0	1	0	0	0	0	0	X	1

Sheet B	1	2	3	4	5	6	7	8	Final
Estonia (Koitmäe) 🔨	1	0	0	0	1	0	0	X	2
Norway (Stordahl)	0	1	1	2	0	1	1	X	6

Sheet C	1	2	3	4	5	6	7	8	Final
Latvia (Rožkova)	1	1	0	1	0	0	2	0	5
South Korea (Jung) 🔨	0	0	2	0	1	1	0	2	6

Sheet D	1	2	3	4	5	6	7	8	Final
China (Wang) 🔨	1	1	2	2	0	1	0	X	7
Slovakia (Ďuriš)	0	0	0	0	1	0	1	X	2

=== Draw 5 ===
Sunday, March 1, 7:00 pm

Sheet A	1	2	3	4	5	6	7	8	Final
China (Wang)	2	0	4	1	0	1	X	X	8
Czech Republic (Selnekovičová) 🔨	0	1	0	0	1	0	X	X	2

Sheet B	1	2	3	4	5	6	7	8	Final
Sweden (Petersson-Dahl) 🔨	0	2	0	1	0	1	0	1	5
Switzerland (Pfyffer)	1	0	1	0	1	0	0	0	3

Sheet C	1	2	3	4	5	6	7	8	Final
Norway (Stordahl) 🔨	1	2	0	2	0	0	1	1	7
Russia (Kurokhtin)	0	0	3	0	2	1	0	0	6

Sheet D	1	2	3	4	5	6	7	8	Final
Canada (Ideson) 🔨	0	2	1	0	1	1	0	1	6
South Korea (Jung)	1	0	0	1	0	0	1	0	3

=== Draw 6 ===
Monday, March 2, 9:00 am

Sheet A	1	2	3	4	5	6	7	8	Final
Slovakia (Ďuriš)	0	1	2	0	0	2	0	X	5
Latvia (Rožkova) 🔨	3	0	0	2	3	0	2	X	10

Sheet B	1	2	3	4	5	6	7	8	EE	Final
South Korea (Jung) 🔨	1	1	0	1	1	0	0	0	0	4
China (Wang)	0	0	1	0	0	1	1	1	2	6

Sheet C	1	2	3	4	5	6	7	8	Final
Estonia (Koitmäe) 🔨	0	3	0	0	0	3	0	X	6
Scotland (Nibloe)	2	0	2	0	4	0	3	X	11

Sheet D	1	2	3	4	5	6	7	8	Final
Switzerland (Pfyffer) 🔨	1	0	1	1	0	1	0	1	5
Norway (Stordahl)	0	0	0	0	2	0	1	0	3

=== Draw 7 ===
Monday, March 2, 2:00 pm

Sheet A	1	2	3	4	5	6	7	8	Final
Russia (Kurokhtin)	0	1	0	0	1	0	2	X	4
China (Wang) 🔨	1	0	1	3	0	1	0	X	6

Sheet B	1	2	3	4	5	6	7	8	EE	Final
Norway (Stordahl) 🔨	1	0	1	0	2	0	1	0	1	6
Czech Republic (Selnekovičová)	0	1	0	1	0	1	0	2	0	5

Sheet C	1	2	3	4	5	6	7	8	Final
Switzerland (Pfyffer)	0	0	0	2	0	0	2	0	4
Canada (Ideson) 🔨	0	1	2	0	1	1	0	1	6

Sheet D	1	2	3	4	5	6	7	8	EE	Final
South Korea (Jung)	0	1	0	1	0	0	2	0	0	4
Sweden (Petersson-Dahl) 🔨	0	0	1	0	1	1	0	1	1	5

=== Draw 8 ===
Monday, March 2, 7:00 pm

Sheet A	1	2	3	4	5	6	7	8	EE	Final
Czech Republic (Selnekovičová) 🔨	0	0	0	1	3	2	0	1	0	7
Estonia (Koitmäe)	1	2	1	0	0	0	3	0	1	8

Sheet B	1	2	3	4	5	6	7	8	Final
Scotland (Nibloe)	0	1	0	0	1	0	X	X	2
Canada (Ideson) 🔨	2	0	3	3	0	2	X	X	10

Sheet C	1	2	3	4	5	6	7	8	Final
Sweden (Petersson-Dahl)	2	0	1	1	0	4	2	X	10
Latvia (Rožkova) 🔨	0	1	0	0	3	0	0	X	4

Sheet D	1	2	3	4	5	6	7	8	Final
Slovakia (Ďuriš) 🔨	1	0	1	0	1	1	0	0	4
Russia (Kurokhtin)	0	1	0	2	0	0	2	1	6

=== Draw 9 ===
Tuesday, March 3, 9:00 am

Sheet A	1	2	3	4	5	6	7	8	Final
Switzerland (Pfyffer) 🔨	0	0	1	0	0	0	0	X	1
Slovakia (Ďuriš)	2	1	0	2	2	1	1	X	9

Sheet B	1	2	3	4	5	6	7	8	Final
Estonia (Koitmäe) 🔨	0	0	1	0	0	0	0	X	1
South Korea (Jung)	1	1	0	2	1	1	1	X	7

Sheet C	1	2	3	4	5	6	7	8	Final
Scotland (Nibloe) 🔨	0	0	0	1	1	1	0	X	3
China (Wang)	2	1	1	0	0	0	2	X	6

Sheet D	1	2	3	4	5	6	7	8	Final
Norway (Stordahl)	0	4	1	0	3	0	X	X	8
Latvia (Rožkova) 🔨	0	0	0	2	0	1	X	X	3

=== Draw 10 ===
Tuesday, March 3, 2:00 pm

Sheet A	1	2	3	4	5	6	7	8	Final
Canada (Ideson) 🔨	1	0	0	3	2	0	0	2	8
Norway (Stordahl)	0	0	1	0	0	3	2	0	6

Sheet B	1	2	3	4	5	6	7	8	Final
Sweden (Petersson-Dahl)	0	2	0	0	1	0	0	0	3
China (Wang) 🔨	3	0	0	1	0	0	0	1	5

Sheet C	1	2	3	4	5	6	7	8	Final
South Korea (Jung)	0	0	1	0	0	2	0	0	3
Russia (Kurokhtin) 🔨	1	0	0	1	1	0	1	1	5

Sheet D	1	2	3	4	5	6	7	8	Final
Switzerland (Pfyffer)	0	1	0	0	2	2	0	1	6
Czech Republic (Selnekovičová) 🔨	1	0	2	1	0	0	1	0	5

=== Draw 11 ===
Tuesday, March 3, 7:00 pm

Sheet A	1	2	3	4	5	6	7	8	Final
Scotland (Nibloe)	1	0	1	1	0	1	0	X	4
Sweden (Petersson-Dahl) 🔨	0	1	0	0	3	0	2	X	6

Sheet B	1	2	3	4	5	6	7	8	Final
Latvia (Rožkova)	1	0	0	1	0	1	1	0	4
Canada (Ideson) 🔨	0	2	0	0	3	0	0	2	7

Sheet C	1	2	3	4	5	6	7	8	Final
Czech Republic (Selnekovičová)	0	2	0	0	2	0	1	1	6
Slovakia (Ďuriš) 🔨	2	0	1	3	0	1	0	0	7

Sheet D	1	2	3	4	5	6	7	8	Final
Russia (Kurokhtin) 🔨	3	0	3	2	0	0	0	3	11
Estonia (Koitmäe)	0	1	0	0	2	3	1	0	7

=== Draw 12 ===
Wednesday, March 4, 9:00 am

Sheet A	1	2	3	4	5	6	7	8	Final
Switzerland (Pfyffer)	0	0	0	2	0	1	0	X	3
South Korea (Jung) 🔨	3	1	1	0	1	0	5	X	11

Sheet B	1	2	3	4	5	6	7	8	Final
Russia (Kurokhtin) 🔨	0	1	0	0	0	0	1	X	2
Sweden (Petersson-Dahl)	1	0	0	1	1	1	0	X	4

Sheet C	1	2	3	4	5	6	7	8	Final
China (Wang)	1	0	0	1	0	1	0	1	4
Norway (Stordahl) 🔨	0	1	0	0	1	0	1	0	3

Sheet D	1	2	3	4	5	6	7	8	EE	Final
Czech Republic (Selnekovičová)	1	0	2	0	0	1	0	0	1	5
Canada (Ideson) 🔨	0	1	0	1	1	0	0	1	0	4

=== Draw 13 ===
Wednesday, March 4, 2:00 pm

Sheet A	1	2	3	4	5	6	7	8	Final
Sweden (Petersson-Dahl) 🔨	1	1	1	1	0	0	0	X	4
Canada (Ideson)	0	0	0	0	1	5	3	X	9

Sheet B	1	2	3	4	5	6	7	8	Final
Slovakia (Ďuriš)	1	3	0	2	2	0	X	X	8
Estonia (Koitmäe) 🔨	0	0	0	0	0	1	X	X	1

Sheet C	1	2	3	4	5	6	7	8	Final
Russia (Kurokhtin) 🔨	1	0	0	1	0	0	0	X	2
Czech Republic (Selnekovičová)	0	0	1	0	0	3	1	X	5

Sheet D	1	2	3	4	5	6	7	8	Final
Latvia (Rožkova) 🔨	1	0	0	0	2	1	3	0	7
Scotland (Nibloe)	0	1	3	1	0	0	0	1	6

=== Draw 14 ===
Wednesday, March 4, 7:00 pm

Sheet A	1	2	3	4	5	6	7	8	Final
Norway (Stordahl) 🔨	0	0	0	1	1	0	0	X	2
Scotland (Nibloe)	2	1	1	0	0	1	2	X	7

Sheet B	1	2	3	4	5	6	7	8	Final
China (Wang)	0	1	2	1	0	0	1	0	5
Latvia (Rožkova) 🔨	1	0	0	0	1	1	0	1	4

Sheet C	1	2	3	4	5	6	7	8	Final
Slovakia (Ďuriš)	0	0	2	0	1	0	1	0	4
South Korea (Jung) 🔨	0	3	0	1	0	1	0	1	6

Sheet D	1	2	3	4	5	6	7	8	Final
Estonia (Koitmäe) 🔨	0	2	0	3	0	2	0	0	7
Switzerland (Pfyffer)	0	0	2	0	2	0	1	1	6

=== Draw 15 ===
Thursday, March 5, 9:00 am

Sheet A	1	2	3	4	5	6	7	8	Final
Latvia (Rožkova)	0	1	0	0	0	3	0	1	5
Russia (Kurokhtin) 🔨	1	0	1	1	0	0	1	0	4

Sheet B	1	2	3	4	5	6	7	8	Final
Czech Republic (Selnekovičová)	0	1	0	0	0	0	X	X	1
Scotland (Nibloe) 🔨	2	0	4	3	1	1	X	X	11

Sheet C	1	2	3	4	5	6	7	8	Final
Canada (Ideson)	0	1	0	0	0	1	0	X	2
Estonia (Koitmäe) 🔨	1	0	0	1	3	0	2	X	7

Sheet D	1	2	3	4	5	6	7	8	Final
Sweden (Petersson-Dahl) 🔨	1	0	2	1	0	0	1	1	6
Slovakia (Ďuriš)	0	1	0	0	0	2	0	0	3

=== Draw 16 ===
Thursday, March 5, 2:00 pm

Sheet A	1	2	3	4	5	6	7	8	Final
Estonia (Koitmäe) 🔨	0	1	0	0	1	0	X	X	2
China (Wang)	2	0	4	3	0	0	X	X	9

Sheet B	1	2	3	4	5	6	7	8	Final
Norway (Stordahl) 🔨	2	3	1	0	0	2	0	X	8
Slovakia (Ďuriš)	0	0	0	2	0	0	3	X	5

Sheet C	1	2	3	4	5	6	7	8	Final
Latvia (Rožkova)	2	0	1	0	0	0	1	0	4
Switzerland (Pfyffer) 🔨	0	1	0	1	1	1	0	2	6

Sheet D	1	2	3	4	5	6	7	8	Final
Scotland (Nibloe)	0	1	0	0	0	3	0	X	4
South Korea (Jung) 🔨	2	0	0	1	1	0	3	X	7

=== Draw 17 ===
Thursday, March 5, 7:00 pm

Sheet A	1	2	3	4	5	6	7	8	Final
South Korea (Jung) 🔨	0	2	0	0	0	0	0	X	2
Czech Republic (Selnekovičová)	0	0	1	1	0	1	1	X	4

Sheet B	1	2	3	4	5	6	7	8	Final
Switzerland (Pfyffer) 🔨	1	0	0	0	0	0	X	X	1
Russia (Kurokhtin)	0	1	2	1	3	2	X	X	9

Sheet C	1	2	3	4	5	6	7	8	Final
Norway (Stordahl)	0	0	1	0	0	1	0	X	2
Sweden (Petersson-Dahl) 🔨	2	0	0	0	2	0	1	X	5

Sheet D	1	2	3	4	5	6	7	8	Final
Canada (Ideson)	0	0	2	0	0	0	X	X	2
China (Wang) 🔨	2	2	0	4	1	3	X	X	12

== Playoffs ==
Qualification games
4	Norway	4
5	Russia	6
3	Canada	5
6	South Korea	4

Semifinals
1	China	4
5	Russia	9
2	Sweden	2
3	Canada	3

Final
5	Russia	5
3	Canada	4
Bronze medal game
1	China	2
2	Sweden	5

=== Qualification games ===
Friday, March 6, 1:00 pm

Sheet B	1	2	3	4	5	6	7	8	EE	Final
Canada (Ideson) 🔨	0	1	0	0	2	1	0	0	1	5
South Korea (Jung)	0	0	1	1	0	0	1	1	0	4

Sheet D	1	2	3	4	5	6	7	8	EE	Final
Norway (Stordahl)	0	1	0	1	2	0	0	0	0	4
Russia (Kurokhtin) 🔨	1	0	1	0	0	1	0	1	2	6

=== Semifinals ===
Friday, March 6, 7:00 pm

Sheet B	1	2	3	4	5	6	7	8	Final
China (Wang) 🔨	1	0	1	0	1	0	1	0	4
Russia (Kurokhtin)	0	1	0	3	0	2	0	3	9

Sheet D	1	2	3	4	5	6	7	8	EE	Final
Sweden (Petersson-Dahl) 🔨	0	0	1	0	0	1	0	0	0	2
Canada (Ideson)	0	0	0	1	0	0	0	1	1	3

=== Bronze medal game ===
Saturday, March 7, 10:00 am

Sheet C	1	2	3	4	5	6	7	8	EE	Final
China (Wang) 🔨	0	0	1	0	0	0	1	0	0	2
Sweden (Petersson-Dahl)	0	0	0	0	0	1	0	1	3	5

=== Final ===
Saturday, March 7, 2:30 pm

Sheet C	1	2	3	4	5	6	7	8	Final
Russia (Kurokhtin)	0	1	0	1	0	1	1	1	5
Canada (Ideson) 🔨	2	0	1	0	1	0	0	0	4

== See also ==
- 2019 World Wheelchair-B Curling Championship
