= Jacqui Kapinowski =

American Paralympian curler and rower (born 1962)

Jacqueline "Jacqui" Kapinowski (born November 28, 1962) is a two-time American Paralympian who competed in wheelchair curling at the 2010 Winter Paralympics and in rowing at the 2016 Summer Paralympics.

== Personal life ==
Kapinowski was born in Belleville, New Jersey, on November 28, 1962. Raised in Point Pleasant, New Jersey, she attended Point Pleasant Borough High School. She had bacterial meningitis at ages 23 and 28 and started having seizures at age 35.

At the age of 39 she was diagnosed with stiff person syndrome (SPS), a neurological disease that results in her needing to use a wheelchair as it makes walking painful and causes seizures and spasms. It has also resulted in broken ribs and vertebrae. In 2014 she was diagnosed with thyroid and throat cancer but reports being cancer-free in 2017. She is married with two sons and a grandson.

== Curling ==
Although Kapinowski knew about curling due to her Scottish heritage, her introduction to curling was at the Plainfield Curling Club in 2007. "I found it very intriguing just trying to understand the sport. I loved it. I don't think people realize how difficult the sport really is," she has remarked.

At the 2008 World Wheelchair Curling Championship held in Sursee, Switzerland, she was part of the American team that won the bronze medal. At the 2009 Championships in Vancouver, Canada, she was a member of the US team that finished in fourth place.

Kapinowski was selected as part of the United States team for the 2010 Winter Paralympics held in Vancouver. She competed in the mixed gender event as the lead for the US team which also included Augusto Perez (skip), Patrick McDonald (third), James Pierce (second) and alternate James Joseph. The team finished second in the round robin stage, winning seven of their nine matches to progress to the semifinal. Playing South Korea the US team lost the match 5–7, meaning they advanced to the bronze medal match to face Sweden. The Swedish team won 7–5 and the US team finished outside of the medals in fourth position.

In March 2011 she announced her retirement from wheelchair curling, citing the fact that she had moved permanently to Florida.

== Rowing ==
After her move to Florida following the 2010 Paralympics, she contacted Navesink Rowing Club in order to try the sport.

In 2011, she finished ninth in the trunk and arms mixed double sculls event at the World Rowing Championships held in Bled, Slovenia.

At the 2015 World Rowing Championships held at Lac d'Aiguebelette, Aiguebelette in France, she finished second in the B final, eighth overall, to secure the United States team a quota position for the women's single skulls at the 2016 Summer Paralympics, to be held in Rio de Janeiro, Brazil. At the US Olympic and Paralympic rowing team trials held in Sarasota, Florida in April 2016, Kapinowski won the women's arms and shoulders single sculls (ASW1x) event, confirming her qualification to compete in Rio. At the 2016 Summer Paralympics in Rio she competed with two broken ribs, finishing the ASW1x event in seventh place.

== Marathon ==
Kapinowski has been a runner and athlete her whole life, even before the onset of SPS. She has competed in 80 marathons, 19 of which as a runner. She has stated that she is the only woman to have competed in both the running and wheelchair categories in both the Boston Marathon and New York City Marathon.

== Other sports ==
She won bronze medals at the 2007 and 2008 Marathon World Championships and also won a 2013 world championship bronze medal in Paratriathlon.
