= Svetlana Pakhomova =

Russian wheelchair curler

Svetlana Pakhomenko
- Curler
- Born: 20 June 1965 (age 61); Dolgoprudny, RSFSR, Soviet Union

Team
- Curling club: Moscow Oblast
- Skip: Andrey Smirnov
- Third: Konstantin Kurokhtin
- Second: Svetlana Pakhomova
- Lead: Alexander Shevchenko
- Alternate: Marat Romanov
Medal record
Wheelchair curling
Representing Russia
Paralympic Games
Silver medal – second place	2014 Sochi	Team
World Championship
Gold medal – first place	2012 Chuncheon	Team
Gold medal – first place	2015 Lohja	Team
Gold medal – first place	2016 Lucerne	Team

Svetlana Vasilyevna Pakhomova (Russian: Светла́на Васи́льевна Пахо́мова; born 20 June 1965 in Dolgoprudny) is a Russian wheelchair curler playing as second for the Russian wheelchair curling team. She and her team won the silver medal at the 2014 Paralympic Games and gold medals at the 2012, 2015 and 2016 World Championships.

== Biography ==
In 1994, Pakhomova and her whole family were in a car accident, the future curler injured her spine. She won the Junior National Swimming Championships.

Pakhomova started her curling career in September 2007. She was national champion of 2011/2012 as a member of the club "Stolitsa". During the 2012/2013 season she became third at the nationals, now playing for Moscow Oblast.

She is a graduate of the Moscow Institute of Electronics and Mathematics.

== Personal life ==
Being married, she has two sons, Dmitry and Nikita, with her husband Aleksandr.

== Awards ==
- Medal of the Order "For Merit to the Fatherland" I class (17 March 2014) – for the huge contribution to the development of physical culture and sports, and for the high athletic performances at the 2014 Paralympic Winter Games in Sochi
- Merited Master of Sports of Russia (2013)
