= Alexander Shevchenko (curler) =

Russian wheelchair curler

- Curler
- Born: 3 June 1971 (age 55); Solnechnogorsk, RSFSR, Soviet Union

Team
- Curling club: Stolitsa
- Skip: Andrey Smirnov
- Third: Konstantin Kurokhtin
- Second: Svetlana Pakhomova
- Lead: Alexander Shevchenko
- Alternate: Marat Romanov
Medal record
Wheelchair curling
Representing Russia
Paralympic Games
Silver medal – second place	2014 Sochi
World Championship
Gold medal – first place	2012 Chuncheon
Gold medal – first place	2015 Lohja
Gold medal – first place	2016 Lucerne
Silver medal – second place	2017 Gangneung
Russian Wheelchair Curling Championship
Gold medal – first place	2020 Novosibirsk

Alexander Alexeyevich Shevchenko (Russian: Алекса́ндр Алексе́евич Шевче́нко; born 3 June 1971) is a Russian wheelchair curler playing as lead for the Russian wheelchair curling team. He and his team won the silver medal at the 2014 Paralympic Games, gold medals at the 2012, 2015, and 2016 World Championships, and the silver medal at the 2017 World Championships

== Biography ==
Shevhcenko came to curling after a car accident.

== Awards ==
- Medal of the Order "For Merit to the Fatherland" I class (17 March 2014) – for the huge contribution to the development of physical culture and sports, and for the high athletic performances at the 2014 Paralympic Winter Games in Sochi
- Laureate of the "Return to Life" award in 2013
