= Gry Roaldseth =

Norwegian female curler and coach

- Curler ♀
- Born: April 1, 1969 (age 57)

Curling career
- Member Association: Norway
Medal record
Curling

Gry Roaldseth (born April 1, 1969) is a Norwegian female curler and coach.

== Record as a coach of national teams ==
| Year | Tournament, event | National team | Place |
|---|---|---|---|
| 2004 | 2004 World Wheelchair Curling Championship | Norway (wheelchair) | 12 |
