= Utica Curling Club =

- Location: 8300 Clark Mills Road; Whitesboro, New York 13492-3912

Information
- Established: 1868
- Club type: Dedicated ice
- USCA region: Grand National Curling Club
- Sheets of ice: Six
- Website: http://www.uticacurlingclub.org

The Utica Curling Club is located in Whitesboro, New York. The club was founded in 1868 and is one of the oldest curling clubs in the United States. A member of the Grand National Curling Club (GNCC), the Utica Curling Club is the largest curling club on the East Coast, and has 6 sheets of ice and over 200 members. In 1916 it became the permanent host of the Mitchell men's bonspiel.

== History ==
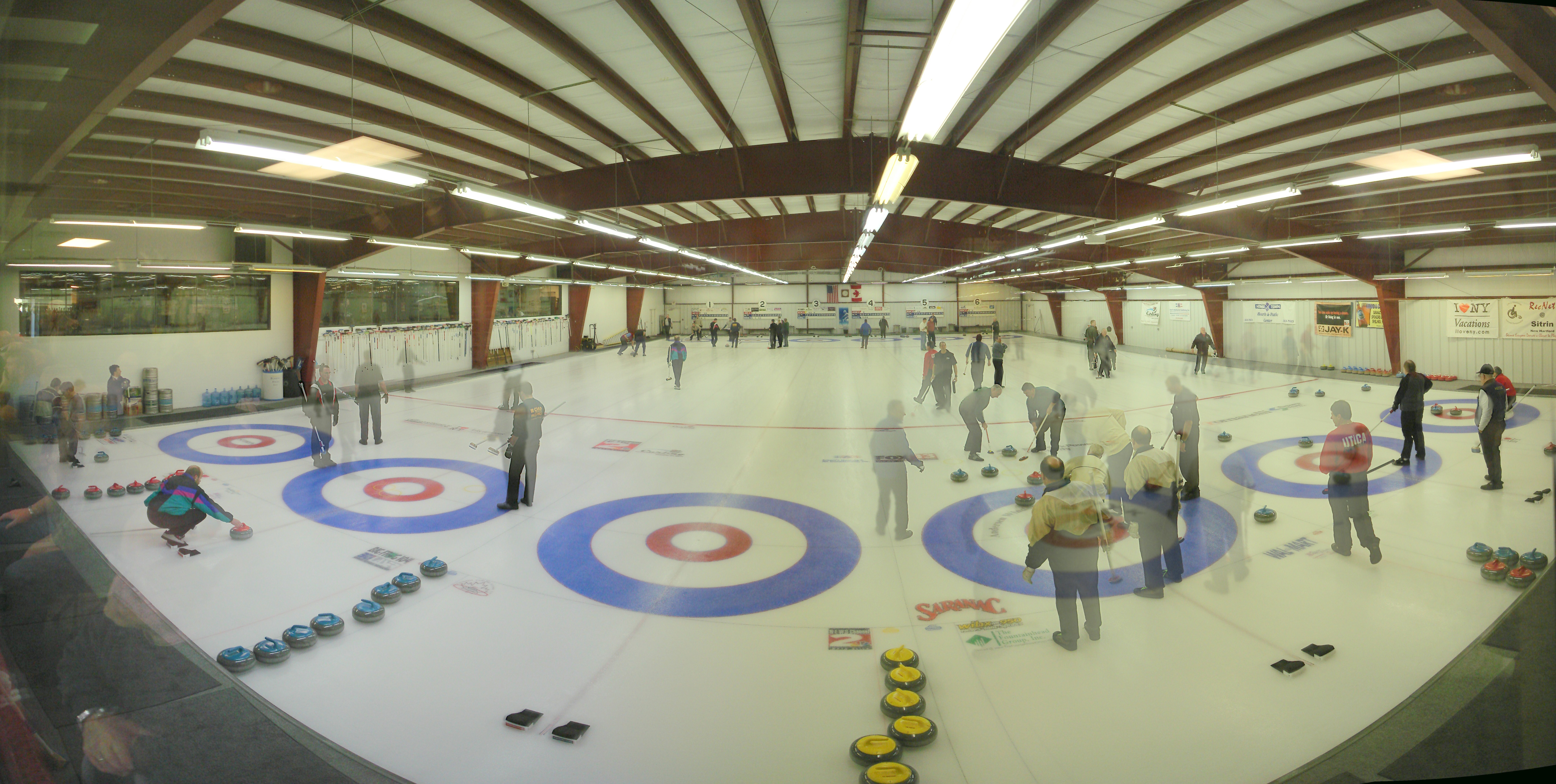
Curling at the Utica Curling Club

- 1832 Outdoor curling began on a frozen pond in Clark Mills, New York
- 1868 Utica Curling Club is founded
- 1890 An enclosed curling shed was constructed
- 1911 Mitchell Bonspiel played for the first time
- 1916 An indoor club was built on Francis Street in Utica, New York
- 1995 The Francis Street club was destroyed by fire
- 1996 A new facility opened at 8300 Clark Mills Road, Whitesboro, New York
