= John Stone (curler) =

Welsh male curler and coach (born 1934)

- Curler
- Born: 29 October 1934 (age 92)

Team
- Curling club: Deeside CC

Curling career
- Member Association: Wales
- European Championship: 8 (1979, 1983, 1984, 1985, 1986, 1987, 1988, 1990)
Medal record
Curling

John Stone (born 29 October 1934) is a Welsh curler and curling coach.

Stone was a longtime member of the Welsh national men's curling team in the 1980s and 1990s.

== Teams ==
Season	Skip	Third	Second	Lead	Events
1979–80	John Stone	David Humphreys	Gordon Vickers	Peter Hodgkinson	ECC 1979 (9th)
1983–84	John Hunt	John Stone	Peter Williams	Ray King	ECC 1983 (11th)
1984–85	John Hunt	John Stone	Scott Lyon	Ray King	ECC 1984 (13th)
1985–86	John Hunt	John Stone	John Guyan	Scott Lyon	ECC 1985 (13th)
1986–87	John Stone	John Guyan	Michael Hunt	John Hunt	ECC 1986 (12th)
1987–88	John Hunt	John Stone	John Guyan	Michael Hunt	ECC 1987 (13th)
1988–89	John Hunt	John Stone	John Guyan	Michael Hunt	ECC 1988 (13th)
1990–91	John Hunt	John Stone	Scott Lyon	David Stevenson	ECC 1990 (8th)

== Record as a coach of national teams ==
Year	Tournament, event	National team	Place
2004	2004 World Wheelchair Curling Championship	Wales (wheelchair)	13
2005	2005 World Wheelchair Curling Championship	Wales (wheelchair)	11
2006	2006 World Wheelchair Curling Qualification Competition	Wales (wheelchair)	9
2008	2008 World Wheelchair Curling Qualification Competition	Wales (wheelchair)	9
