= Bill Rotton =

American curler and coach

- Curler ♂
- Born: William Nelson Rotton; January 22, 1927; Lincoln, Nebraska, U.S.
- Died: March 7, 2013 (aged 86); New Hartford, New York, U.S.

Team
- Curling club: Utica CC, Utica

Curling career
- Member Association: United States
Medal record
Curling

William Nelson Rotton (January 22, 1927 – March 7, 2013) was an American curler and curling coach.

From 1988 to 1992 he was a President of the International Curling Fellowship of Rotarians.

== Record as a coach of national teams ==
Year	Tournament, event	National team	Place
2005	2005 World Wheelchair Curling Championship	United States (wheelchair)	8
