= Oleg Narinyan =

Russian curler and coach

- Curler ♂
- Born: 21 May 1961 (age 65)

Curling career
- Member Association: Russia
Medal record
Curling

Oleg Narinyan (Russian: Оле́г Нариня́н; born 21 May 1961) is a Russian curler and curling coach.

== Record as a coach of national teams ==
Year	Tournament, event	National team	Place
2004	2004 World Wheelchair Curling Championship	Russia (wheelchair)	9
2005	2005 World Wheelchair Curling Championship	Russia (wheelchair)	15
2007	2007 World Wheelchair Curling Championship	Russia (wheelchair)	8
