= Ingrid Claussen =

Norwegian female curler and coach

- Curler ♀
- Other names: Camilla Claussen
- Born: 30 October 1974 (age 52); Trondheim, Norway

Team
- Curling club: Trondheim Curlingklubb, Trondheim

Curling career
- Member Association: Norway
- Other appearances: World Junior Championships: 2 (1995, 1996)
Medal record
Curling

Ingrid Camilla Claussen (born 30 October 1974 in Trondheim, also known as Camilla Claussen) is a Norwegian female curler and coach.

As a head coach of Norwegian wheelchair curling team she participated in 2006 Winter Paralympics, where Norwegian team finished on fourth place.

== Teams and events ==
Season	Skip	Third	Second	Lead	Events
1994–95	Marianne Haslum	Camilla Claussen	Therese Bye	Hege Sivertsen	WJCC 1995 (8th)
1995–96	Camilla Claussen	Therese Bye	Ingvild Jentoft	Hege Elin Skogan	WJCC 1996 (6th)

== Record as a coach of national teams ==
Year	Tournament, event	National team	Place
2005	2005 World Wheelchair Curling Championship	Norway (wheelchair)	5
