= Diane Brown (curling) =

American curler and coach

- Curler ♀
- Born: February 20, 1946 (age 80)

Curling career
- Member Association: United States
Medal record
Curling

Diane Brown (born February 20, 1946) is an American curler and curling coach.

== Mixed ==
Season	Skip	Third	Second	Lead	Events
1984	Steve Brown	Diane Brown	Vince Fitzgerald	Georgia Fitzgerald	USMxCC 1984 (gold)

== Record as a coach of national teams ==
Year	Tournament, event	National team	Place
2000	2000 World Men's Curling Championship	United States (men)	4
2004	2004 World Wheelchair Curling Championship	United States (wheelchair)	5
2005	2005 World Wheelchair Curling Championship	United States (wheelchair)	8

== Personal life ==
Brown is from a family of well-known American curlers. Diane's husband Steve Brown is also a curler and coach, as well as three-time US men's champion and Worlds bronze medalist. Together they won the US Mixed championship in 1984. Their children, Craig Brown and Erika Brown, are also US champions and World medalists.

Brown is co-founder and co-owner of Steve's Curling Supplies, a curling equipment company.
