= Anton Batugin =

Russian curler and coach (born 1980)

- Curler ♂
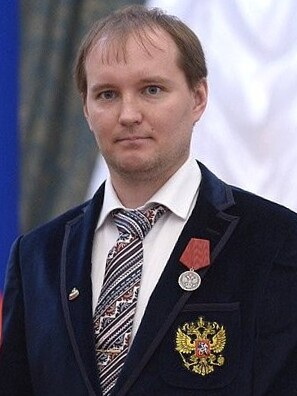
- Born: 30 November 1980 (age 45); Kemerovo

Curling career
- Member Association: Kazakhstan
Medal record
Curling

Anton Andrianovich Batugin (Russian: Анто́н Андриа́нович Бату́гин, born 30 November 1980 in Kemerovo) is a Russian curler and curling coach.

As a coach of Russian wheelchair curling team he participated in 2014 and 2018 Winter Paralympics. In 2018 the Russian National team won the tournament in Kisakallio.

As a curler at the international level he played for Belarus on 2005 and 2009 European championships.

In 2020 the Russian National team beat Canada for the gold medal at the World Wheelchair Curling Championship.

== Teams ==
Season	Skip	Third	Second	Lead	Alternate	Events
2005–06	Oleksii Voloshenko	Yuri Kochubey	Ihar Mishaniov	Anton Batugin		ECC 2005 (27th)
2009–10	Ihar Platonov	Anton Batugin	Yury Pauliuchyk	Andrey Aulasenka	Yuri Karanevich	ECC 2009 (30th)

== Record as a coach of national teams ==
Year	Tournament, event	National team	Place
2012	2012 World Wheelchair Curling Championship	Russia (wheelchair)	1st place, gold medalist(s)
2013	2013 World Wheelchair Curling Championship	Russia (wheelchair)	5
2014	2014 Winter Paralympics	Russia (wheelchair)	2nd place, silver medalist(s)
2015	2015 World Wheelchair Curling Championship	Russia (wheelchair)	1st place, gold medalist(s)
2016	2016 World Wheelchair Curling Championship	Russia (wheelchair)	1st place, gold medalist(s)
2017	2017 World Wheelchair Curling Championship	Russia (wheelchair)	2nd place, silver medalist(s)
2017	2017 World Mixed Doubles Curling Championship	Belarus (mixed doubles)	22
2018	2018 Winter Paralympics	Russia (wheelchair)	5
2018	2018 World Mixed Curling Championship	Belarus (mixed)	14
2019	2019 World Wheelchair Curling Championship	Russia (wheelchair)	7
2019	2019 World Senior Curling Championships	Hong Kong (senior men)	19
2020	2020 World Wheelchair Curling Championship	Russia (wheelchair)	1st place, gold medalist(s)
2021	2021 World Wheelchair Curling Championship	Russia (wheelchair)	3rd place, bronze medalist(s)
2024	2024 Pan Continental Curling Championship B-Division	Kazakhstan (men)	2nd place, silver medalist(s)
2024	2024 Pan Continental Curling Championship B-Division	Kazakhstan (women)	3rd place, bronze medalist(s)
