= Marat Romanov =

Russian wheelchair curler

- Curler
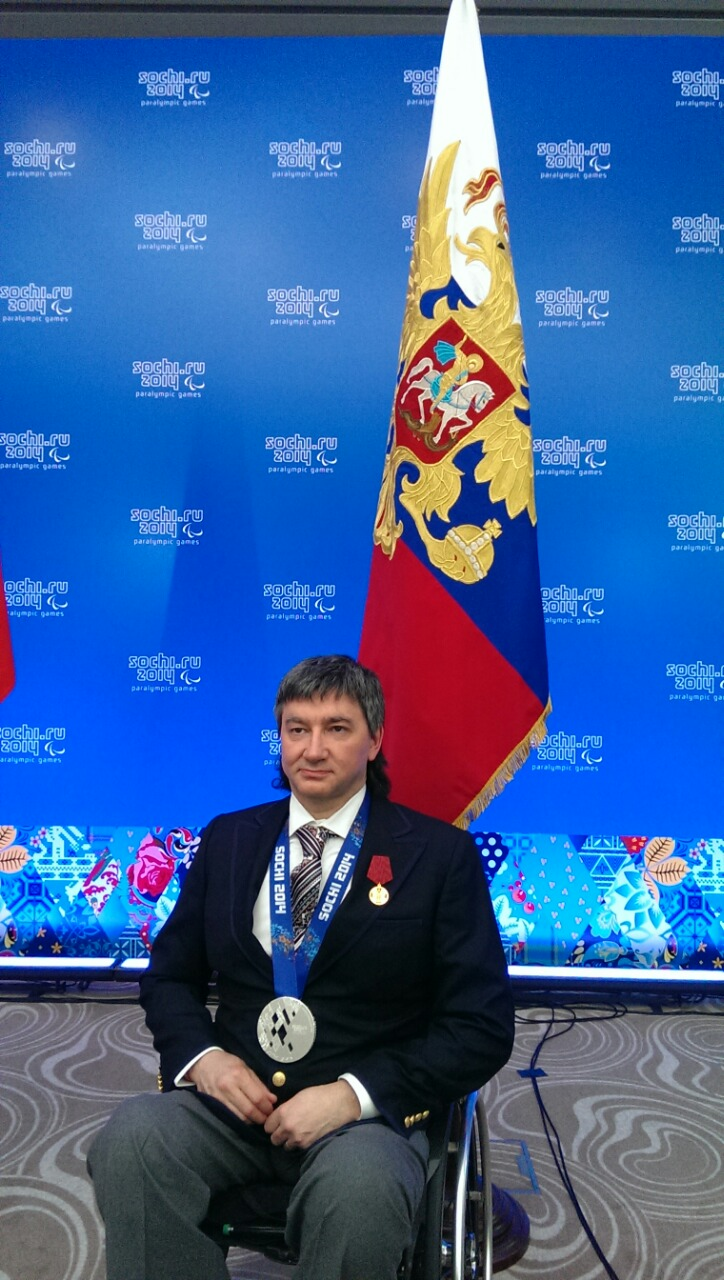
- Born: 5 June 1966 (age 60); Chelyabinsk, RSFSR, Soviet Union

Team
- Curling club: Granit
- Skip: Andrey Smirnov
- Third: Konstantin Kurokhtin
- Second: Svetlana Pakhomova
- Lead: Alexander Shevchenko
- Alternate: Marat Romanov
Medal record
Wheelchair curling
Representing Russia
Paralympic Games
Silver medal – second place	2014 Sochi
World Championship
Gold medal – first place	2012 Chuncheon
Gold medal – first place	2015 Lohja
Gold medal – first place	2016 Lucerne
Silver medal – second place	2017 Gangneung

Marat Marsovich Romanov (Russian: Мара́т Ма́рсович Рома́нов; born 5 June 1966) is a Russian wheelchair curler playing as alternate for the Russian wheelchair curling team. He and his team won the silver medal at the 2014 Paralympic Games, gold medals at the 2012, 2015, and 2016 World Championships, and the silver medal at the 2017 World Championships

== Biography ==
Marat Romanov was born on 5 June 1966 in Chelyabinsk, Russian SFSR, Soviet Union. After school, Marat was trained as an assistant engine driver and spent a few years in the Soviet Navy before getting the job of a smelter at the Chelyabinsk Metallurgical Plant. In his spare time, he enjoyed mountaineering.

Romanov came to curling after a car accident in 1996, after which he received a vertebral compression fracture. He also did basketball and arm wrestling. In May 2007 he formed a curling team in Chelyabinsk, where he was a skip.

In 2009, he graduated from the Department of Physical Education at the Ural State Academy of Physical Education in Chelyabinsk.

== Awards ==
- Medal of the Order "For Merit to the Fatherland" I class (17 March 2014) – for the huge contribution to the development of physical culture and sports, and for the high athletic performances at the 2014 Paralympic Winter Games in Sochi
- Merited Master of Sports of Russia (2013)
