= Andrey Smirnov (curler) =

Russian wheelchair curler

- Curler
- Born: 28 August 1973 (age 53); Sverdlovsk (now Yekaterinburg), RSFSR, Soviet Union

Team
- Curling club: Rodnik
- Skip: Andrey Smirnov
- Third: Konstantin Kurokhtin
- Second: Svetlana Pakhomova
- Lead: Alexander Shevchenko
- Alternate: Marat Romanov
Medal record
Men's curling
Representing Russia
Paralympic Games
Silver medal – second place	2014 Sochi
World Championship
Gold medal – first place	2012 Chuncheon
Gold medal – first place	2015 Lohja
Gold medal – first place	2016 Lucerne
Silver medal – second place	2017 Gangneung
Russian Wheelchair Curling Championship
Silver medal – second place	2020 Novosibirsk

Andrey Viktorovich Smirnov (Russian: Андре́й Ви́кторович Смирно́в; born 28 August 1973) is a Russian wheelchair curler playing as skip for the Russian wheelchair curling team. He and his team won the silver medal at the 2014 Paralympic Games and gold medals at the 2012 and 2015 World Championships.

== Biography ==
As a child Smirnov did speed skating, but after an accident at the age of 12, when he fell into an elevator pit on a building site, he performed sports including arm wrestling, darts, tennis and basketball.

Besides his success in international tournaments Smirnov won bronze at the 2011-12 Russian National Championships. He is a member of the local sports club "Rodnik" in Yekaterinburg.

== Awards ==
- Medal of the Order "For Merit to the Fatherland" I class (17 March 2014) – for the huge contribution to the development of physical culture and sports, and for the high athletic performances at the 2014 Paralympic Winter Games in Sochi
- Merited Master of Sports of Russia
