= Swiss Wheelchair Curling Championship =

The Swiss Wheelchair Curling Championship is the national championship of wheelchair curling teams in Switzerland. It has been held annually since the 2003–2004 season. The championships are organized by the Swiss Curling Association.

== List of champions ==
Curler name with bold font is skip.

| Year Host city | Champions Team (order: skip, third, second, lead, alternate) | Place at Worlds |
|---|---|---|
| 2004; Thun | Langenthal; Urs Bucher, Manfred Bolliger, Cesare Cassani, Therese Kämpfer | 2nd place, silver medalist(s) |
| 2005; Bern | Bern; Urs Bucher, Therese Kämpfer, Cesare Cassani, Manfred Bolliger, alternate: Erwin Lauper | 3rd place, bronze medalist(s) |
| 2006; Wetzikon | Limmattal / Zürich; Walter Stolarz, Max Brunner, Susanne Schwendinger, Ruth Tesch | |
| 2007; Urdorf | Bern 1 Manfred Bolliger, Erwin Lauper, Cesare Cassani, Madeleine Wildi, alternate: Claudia Tosse | 2nd place, silver medalist(s) |
| 2008; Gstaad | Bern 1 Manfred Bolliger, Erwin Lauper, Cesare Cassani, Madeleine Wildi, alternate: Therese Kämpfer | 8th |
| 2009; Bern | Bern; Daniel Meyer, Melanie Villars, Martin Bieri, Susanne von Gunten, alternate: Manfred Bolliger | — |
| 2010; Thun | RC Beider Basel 1 Rony Liechtenhan, Sybille Steiner, Christian Burkhalter, Hans Ulrich Hofer, alternate: Astrid Tschopp | |
| 2011; Gstaad / Wetzikon | Lausanne Olympique; Didier Recordon, Eric Décorvet, Michel Fernandez, Mireille Gauthey | — |
| 2012; Thun / Luzern | RC Wetzikon 1 Claudia Hüttenmoser, Felix Wagner, Ivo Hasler, Josef Ramel, coaches: Peter Nater, Susanne Luchsinger | — |
| 2013; Thun | CC Wetzikon 1 Felix Wagner, Marcel Bodenmann, Heiri Isler, Vroni Forrer, coach: Susanne Luchsinger | — |
| 2014; Wetzikon | Bern; Manfred Bolliger, Anton Kehrli, Hans Burgener, Susanne von Gunten, alternates: Martin Bieri, Marianne Läderach, coach: Toni Reusser | |
| 2015; Wetzikon | Wetzikon; Felix Wagner, Marcel Bodenmann, Harry Pavel, Marlise Schwitter, alternates: Werner Locher, Claudia Baumgartner, coach: Harry Burger | — |
| 2016; Lausanne | Wetzikon; Felix Wagner, Marcel Bodenmann, Harry Pavel, Marlise Schwitter, alternates: Claudia Baumgartner, Werner Locher, Lorna Rettig, coach: Peter Nater | 4th |
| 2017; St. Gallen | RC St. Gallen 1 Claudia Hüttenmoser, Ivo Hasler, Burkhard Möller, Claudia Baumgartner, coach: René Rohr | — |
| 2018; Genève | Lausanne Olympique 1 Eric Décorvet, Didier Recordon, Léo Gottet, Mélanie Villars, alternate: Christine Gringet | |
| 2019; St. Gallen | Montana Tor; Raymond Pfyffer, Philippe Bétrisey, Patrick Delacretaz, Françoise Jacquerod, alternate: Hans Burgener | 5th |
| 2020; Brig | Crans Montana Tor; Raymond Pfyffer, Hans Burgener, Françoise Jaquerod, Bernard Moriset, alternate: Patrick Delacretaz | 11th |
| 2021 | not held | |
| 2022; Geneva | Brig; Françoise Jaquerod, Hans Burgener, Patrick Delacretaz, Léo Gottet | — |
| 2023; St. Gallen | Oberwallis; Françoise Jaquerod, Hans Burgener, Léo Gottet, Patrick Delacretaz | — |
| 2024; Bern | Bern; Hans Burgener, Konstantin Schmaeh, Pierre-Alain Tercier, Stéphanie Combremont, alternate: Mélanie Villars, coach: Jasmin Villars | — |
| 2025; Bern | Genève 1 Murad Mirza, Laurent Kneubühl, Oleksii Muravschykov, Isabelle Champion, coach: Romain Borini | — |
| 2026; Bern | Bern; Hans Burgener, Konstantin Schmaeh (Skip), Pierre-Alain Tercier, Stéphanie Combremont, alternate: Susanne von Gunten | |

== See also ==
- Swiss Men's Curling Championship
- Swiss Women's Curling Championship
- Swiss Mixed Curling Championship
- Swiss Mixed Doubles Curling Championship
- Swiss Junior Curling Championships
- Swiss Junior Mixed Doubles Curling Championship
- Swiss Senior Curling Championships
