= Norway at the 2018 Winter Paralympics =

- IPC code: NOR
- NPC: Norwegian Olympic and Paralympic Committee and Confederation of Sports
- Website: www.idrett.no

in Pyeongchang
- Competitors: 35 in 6 sports
- Medals: Gold 1 Silver 3 Bronze 4 Total 8

Winter Paralympics appearances (overview)
- 1976; 1980; 1984; 1988; 1992; 1994; 1998; 2002; 2006; 2010; 2014; 2018; 2022; 2026

Norway sent competitors to the 2018 Winter Paralympics in Pyeongchang, South Korea. People competed in para-alpine skiing, para-Nordic skiing, para-snowboarding, sledge hockey and wheelchair curling.

== Team ==
The table below contains the list of members of people (called "Team Norway") that competed in the 2018 Games.

Team Norway
Name	Sport	Gender	Classification	Club	Events	ref
Johannes Birkelund	para-Nordic skiing	male		Oppegård IL	cross country skiing	
Eirik Bye	para-Nordic skiing	male		Oppegård IL		
Rikke Iversen	wheelchair curling	male		Halden Curling Club	mixed team	
Trygve Toskedal Larsen	para-Nordic skiing	male		Avaldsnes IL/Trysilgutten IL		
Rune Lorentsen	wheelchair curling	male		Halden Curling Club	mixed team	
Sissel Løchen	wheelchair curling			Stavanger Curlingklubb	mixed team	
Kristian Moen	para-snowboarding			Funkis Snowboardklubb		
Arvid Nelson	para-Nordic skiing	male	guide skier	Svarstad IL	cross country skiing	
Vilde Nilsen	para-Nordic skiing	female		Kvaløysletta Skilag/Tromsø SSL	cross country skiing	
Håkon Grønsveen Olsrud	para-Nordic skiing	male		Nordbygda/Løten Ski	cross country skiing	
Jesper Saltvik Pedersen	para-alpine skiing	male		Plogen Skiklubb		
Birgit Skarstein	para-Nordic skiing	female		Frol IL	cross country skiing	
Jostein Stordahl	wheelchair curling	male		Halden Curling Club	mixed team	
Ole Fredrik Syversen	wheelchair curling	male		Halden Curling Club	mixed team	
Nils-Erik Ulset	para-Nordic skiing	male		Tingvoll IL		

Owe Lüthcke is a sledge hockey referee. The Norwegian went to Pyeongchang to referee matches. He was part of the official Norwegian delegation.

== Goals ==
For the 2018 Winter Paralympics, Nord-Trøndelag County Council has some goals. These included getting more people to compete in disability sports. They also wanted to increase the level of accessibility to sports buildings and sports field in Nord-Trøndelag County and the rest of Norway.

== Doping ==
In December 2017, Norway said it would not send any anti-doping officials to the Winter Olympics or Paralympics. They are tired of needing to use unpaid volunteers. They think anti-doping officials need to be paid. Anti-doping Norway chief executive Anders Solheim said, "If you sell TV rights for this arrangement for billions of dollars, then we think it's wrong that we pay for Norwegian doping controllers to help with the controls. An inspector should receive a reasonable salary and his trip paid for the three weeks he or she will be there. By not paying doping controllers, the organisers are de facto relying on volunteers. Anti-doping work should not be a voluntary profession for those who want to. It is downplaying the priority of our work, and we are tired of it."

== Medalists ==
Medal	Name	Sport	Event	Date
Gold	Jesper Pedersen	Alpine skiing	Men's giant slalom, sitting	14 March
Silver	Vilde Nilsen	Cross-country skiing	Women's sprint classical, standing	14 March
Silver	Rune Lorentsen; Jostein Stordahl; Ole Fredrik Syversen; Sissel Løchen; Rikke Iversen	Wheelchair curling	Mixed team	17 March
Silver	Nils-Erik Ulset; Håkon Olsrud; Eirik Bye; Guide: Arvid Nelson	Cross-country skiing	4 × 2.5 km open relay	18 March
Bronze	Håkon Olsrud	Cross-country skiing	Men's 20 km free, standing	12 March
Bronze	Jesper Pedersen	Alpine skiing	Men's super combined, sitting	13 March
Bronze	Eirik Bye; Guide: Arvid Nelson	Cross-country skiing	Men's sprint classical, visually impaired	14 March
Bronze	Nils-Erik Ulset	Biathlon	Men's 15 km, standing	16 March

== Cross-country skiing ==
Birgit Skarstein competed in two sports: adapted rowing and para-Nordic skiing. She won a gold medal at the 2017 World Rowing Championships in the PR1 W1x. Skarstein also went to the 2016 Summer Paralympics, and she finished fourth. Skarstein has also went to the 2014 Winter Paralympics, competing in para-Nordic skiing.

== Para ice hockey ==
Summary

Key:

- OT – Overtime
- GWS – Match decided by penalty-shootout

Team	Group stage				Semifinal / Pl.	Final / BM / Pl.	
Team	Opposition Score	Opposition Score	Opposition Score	Rank	Opposition Score	Opposition Score	Rank
Norway mixed	Italy; L 2–3 GWS	Canada; L 0–8	Sweden; W 3–1	3	Japan; W 6–1	Czech Republic; W 5–2	5

Norway qualified by finishing in the top four at the 2017 Sledge Hockey World Championships. Norway played in a tournament in January in Japan. They lost to the Paralympic Games host nation South Korea 0 - 5 in the gold medal game. Norway lost to Italy 4 - 3 in overtime at a tournament in Turin in January 2018.

=== Roster ===
Lena Schrøder is the only woman to compete in sledge hockey at the 2018 Winter Paralympics. While the sport allows both men and women to compete against each other, this rarely happens at the Paralympic level.

Norway roster
Name	Position	Number	Club	ref
Torstein Aanekre	forward	34	Mjøsa Pikes	
Thommas Avdal	defenseman	24	VIF Para Ishockey	
Audun Bakke	forward	22	VIF Para Ishockey	
Magnus Bøgle	forward	12	IL Kråkene Kjelkehockey	
Kissinger Deng	goaltender	19	VIF Para Ishockey	
Eskil Hagen	defenseman	7	VIF Para Ishockey	
Martin Hamre	forward	20	VIF Para Ishockey	
Kjell Christian Hamar	goaltender	18	VIF Para Ishockey	
Jan Roger Klakegg	defenseman	23	Bergen Parahockeyklubb	
Knut André Nordstoga	defenseman	16	VIF Para Ishockey	
Rolf Einar Pedersen	defenseman	3	VIF Para Ishockey	
Tor Rivera	forward	10	IL Kråkene Kjelkehockey	
Lena Schrøder	forward	26	VIF Para Ishockey	
Emil Sørheim	forward	15	RIHK Kjelkehockey	
Loyd Remi Pallander Solberg	forward	17	VIF Para Ishockey	
Emil Vatne	forward	27	Nærbø IL	
Morten Værnes	forward	9	VIF Para Ishockey	
Ola Bye Øiseth	forward	71	VIF Para Ishockey	

Preliminary round

Pos	Team	Pld	W	OTW	OTL	L	GF	GA	GD	Pts	Qualification
1	Canada	3	3	0	0	0	35	0	+35	9	Semifinals
2	Italy	3	1	1	0	1	5	12	−7	5	Semifinals
3	Norway	3	1	0	1	1	5	12	−7	4	5–8th place semifinals
4	Sweden	3	0	0	0	3	1	22	−21	0	5–8th place semifinals

Source: PyeongChang 2018

10 March 2018; 12:00	Norway	2–3 GWS (0–0, 1–1, 1–1) (OT 0–0) (SO: 0–1)	Italy	Gangneung Hockey Centre; Attendance: 5,543

Game reference

Kjell Christian Hamar
Goalies
Gabriele Araudo
Referee:
(Canada) Kevin Webinger
Linesmen:
(South Korea) Chae Young-jin
(Austria) David Nothegger

	0–1	16:02 – Kalegaris (Leperdi)
Værnes (Nordstoga, Hamre) (PP) – 26:32	1–1
	1–2	33:19 – Rosa (Larch)
Bakke (Nordstoga, Pedersen) – 42:25	2–2

Solberg (miss)
Vatne (miss)
Pedersen (miss)
Shootout
Larch
(miss) Rosa
6 min
Penalties
4 min
12
Shots
18

12 March 2018; 15:30	Canada	8–0 (2–0, 3–0, 3–0)	Norway	Gangneung Hockey Centre; Attendance: 5,886

Game reference

Dominic Larocque
Goalies
Kjell Christian Hamar
Referee:
(Austria) Kristijan Nikolic
Linesmen:
(South Korea) Chae Young-jin
(Sweden) Andreas Lundén

Bridges (Dixon, Arsenault) – 02:33	1–0
Armstrong (Cozzolino, Bowden) – 08:47	2–0
Hickey (PP) – 26:50	3–0
Bowden (Armstrong) – 27:54	4–0
Armstrong (Dunn) – 28:49	5–0
Bridges (Hickey, Arsenault) – 33:59	6–0
Westlake (McGregor) (PP) – 37:21	7–0
McGregor (Cozzolino) (SH) – 41:51	8–0

8 min
Penalties
8 min
27
Shots
5

13 March 2018; 15:30	Norway	3–1 (1–0, 1–0, 1–1)	Sweden	Gangneung Hockey Centre; Attendance: 6,059

Game reference

Kissinger Deng
Goalies
Ulf Nilsson
Referee:
(Japan) Sotaro Yamaguchi
Linesmen:
(South Korea) Chae Young-jin
(Czech Republic) Jan Vaněk

Nordstoga (Bøgle) – 13:07	1–0
Bøgle (Hamre, Solberg) (PP) – 25:00	2–0
	2–1	31:35 – Gyllsten (Kasperi, P. Nilsson)
Bøgle (Værnes) (ENG) – 43:45	3–1

4 min
Penalties
16 min
19
Shots
10

5–8th place semifinal

14 March 2018; 20:00	Norway	6–1 (2–0, 3–1, 1–0)	Japan	Gangneung Hockey Centre; Attendance: 3,919

Game reference

Kjell Christian Hamar
Goalies
Shinobu Fukushima
Kazuya Mochizuki
Referee:
(Canada) Johnathan Morrison
Linesmen:
(Czech Republic) Jan Vaněk
(Czech Republic) Leon Wesley

Bakke (Øiseth) (PP) – 02:25	1–0
Pedersen (Bøgle, Nordstoga) – 09:37	2–0
	2–1	18:20 – Takahashi (Horie) (SH)
Bøgle – 18:34	3–1
Pedersen (Hamre) – 18:55	4–1
Bakke (Værnes, Bøgle) – 20:02	5–1
Pedersen (Bøgle, Nordstoga) – 35:28	6–1

0 min
Penalties
4 min
14
Shots
6

Fifth place game

16 March 2018; 20:00	Norway	5–2 (2–1, 1–0, 2–1)	Czech Republic	Gangneung Hockey Centre; Attendance: 4,805

Game reference

Kjell Christian Hamar
Goalies
Martin Kudela
Referee:
(Canada) Kevin Webinger
Linesmen:
(South Korea) Chae Young-jin
(South Korea) Han Youl

Pedersen (Bøgle) – 00:44	1–0
Bakke (Værnes) – 03:39	2–0
	2–1	14:18 – Krupička (Motyčka)
Pedersen (PP) – 23:44	3–1
	3–2	35:29 – Kubeš (Hábl, Geier) (PP)
Bakke (Værnes, Pedersen) – 40:05	4–2
Bakke (SH, ENG) – 42:03	5–2

10 min
Penalties
31 min
12
Shots
9

== Snowboarding ==
Banked Slalom

Athlete	Event	Run 1	Run 2	Run 3	Best	Rank
Kristian Moen	Men's banked slalom, SB-LL1	1:03.39	59.19	DNF	59.19	7

Snowboard cross

Athlete	Event	Seeding						1/8 final	Quarterfinal	Semifinal	Final	
Athlete	Event	Run 1		Run 2		Best	Seed	1/8 final	Quarterfinal	Semifinal	Final	
Athlete	Event	Time	Rank	Time	Rank	Best	Seed	Position	Position	Position	Position	Rank
Kristian Moen	Men's snowboard cross, SB-LL1	1:15.59	9	Canceled		1:15.59	9 Q	Wagner (DEN); L	Did not advance			9

== Wheelchair curling ==
Summary

Team	Event	Group stage												Tiebreaker	Semifinal	Final / BM	
Team	Event	Opposition Score	Opposition Score	Opposition Score	Opposition Score	Opposition Score	Opposition Score	Opposition Score	Opposition Score	Opposition Score	Opposition Score	Opposition Score	Rank	Opposition Score	Opposition Score	Opposition Score	Rank
Rune Lorentsen; Jostein Stordahl; Ole Fredrik Syversen; Sissel Løchen; Rikke Iversen	Mixed	(United Kingdom) GBR; L 2–5	(Canada) CAN; L 1–10	(China) CHN; L 1–10	(International Paralympic Committee) NPA; W 6–2	(Switzerland) SUI; W 6–3	(Sweden) SWE; L 4–5	(Germany) GER; W 8–6	(South Korea) KOR; W 9–2	(Finland) FIN; W 6–4	(United States) USA; W 5–4	(Slovakia) SVK; W 7–6	4 Q	—N/a	(South Korea) KOR; W 8–6	(China) CHN; L 5–6	2nd place, silver medalist(s)

Pos	Team	Pld	W	L	PF	PA	PD	PCT	Ends Won	Ends Lost	Blank Ends	Stolen Ends	Shot %	Qualification
1	South Korea	11	9	2	65	51	14	0.818	38	36	9	11	66%	Advance to playoffs
2	Canada	11	9	2	74	45	29	0.818	47	28	6	27	62%	Advance to playoffs
3	China	11	9	2	85	42	43	0.818	43	32	2	16	67%	Advance to playoffs
4	Norway	11	7	4	55	57	−2	0.636	41	35	5	15	58%	Advance to playoffs
5	Neutral Paralympic Athletes	11	5	6	61	63	−2	0.455	44	37	2	23	62%	
6	Switzerland	11	5	6	56	63	−7	0.455	36	45	2	11	61%	
7	Great Britain	11	5	6	57	53	4	0.455	41	41	6	20	62%	
8	Germany	11	5	6	57	68	−11	0.455	37	39	5	16	54%	
9	Slovakia	11	4	7	62	72	−10	0.364	39	46	1	11	57%	
10	Sweden	11	4	7	47	66	−19	0.364	29	45	8	8	57%	
11	Finland	11	2	9	53	87	−34	0.182	35	46	1	11	51%	
12	United States	11	2	9	58	63	−5	0.182	37	45	3	12	60%	

Source: Paralympic.org

Round-robin

Norway has a bye in draws 3, 5, 7, 10, 12 and 17.

Draw 1

Saturday, 10 March, 14:35

Sheet A	1	2	3	4	5	6	7	8	Final
Norway (Lorentsen) 🔨	1	0	0	0	0	1	0	0	2
Great Britain (Neilson)	0	1	0	2	0	0	1	1	5

Draw 2

Saturday, 10 March, 19:35

Sheet D	1	2	3	4	5	6	7	8	Final
Canada (Ideson)	0	2	2	1	1	4	X	X	10
Norway (Lorentsen) 🔨	1	0	0	0	0	0	X	X	1

Draw 4

Sunday, 11 March, 14:35

Sheet B	1	2	3	4	5	6	7	8	Final
Norway (Lorentsen) 🔨	0	1	0	0	0	0	X	X	1
China (Wang)	2	0	2	2	2	2	X	X	10

Draw 6

Monday, 12 March, 09:35

Sheet C	1	2	3	4	5	6	7	8	Final
Norway (Stordahl) 🔨	1	1	0	1	1	2	0	X	6
Neutral Paralympic Athletes (Kurokhtin)	0	0	1	0	0	0	1	X	2

Draw 8

Monday, 12 March, 19:35

Sheet A	1	2	3	4	5	6	7	8	Final
Switzerland (Wagner)	0	0	1	0	1	0	1	0	3
Norway (Stordahl) 🔨	1	1	0	2	0	1	0	1	6

Draw 9

Tuesday, 13 March, 09:35

Sheet B	1	2	3	4	5	6	7	8	Final
Norway (Stordahl)	1	0	1	0	1	0	1	0	4
Sweden (Petersson Dahl) 🔨	0	3	0	1	0	1	0	0	5

Draw 11

Tuesday, 13 March, 19:35

Sheet D	1	2	3	4	5	6	7	8	Final
Germany (Putzich)	2	0	2	2	0	0	0	0	6
Norway (Stordahl) 🔨	0	2	0	0	2	1	1	2	8

Draw 13

Wednesday, 14 March, 14:35

Sheet B	1	2	3	4	5	6	7	8	Final
South Korea (Seo)	0	2	0	0	0	0	X	X	2
Norway (Lorentsen) 🔨	2	0	0	2	1	4	X	X	9

Draw 14

Wednesday, 14 March, 19:35

Sheet D	1	2	3	4	5	6	7	8	Final
Norway (Lorentsen) 🔨	2	2	0	1	0	1	0	X	6
Finland (S. Karjalainen)	0	0	1	0	1	0	2	X	4

Draw 15

Thursday, 15 March, 9:35

Sheet C	1	2	3	4	5	6	7	8	Final
United States (Black) 🔨	0	1	1	0	0	2	0	0	4
Norway (Lorentsen)	1	0	0	2	1	0	0	1	5

Draw 16

Thursday, 15 March, 14:35

Sheet A	1	2	3	4	5	6	7	8	EE	Final
Norway (Lorentsen) 🔨	1	0	1	0	1	0	1	2	1	7
Slovakia (Ďuriš)	0	2	0	3	0	1	0	0	0	6

Semifinal

Friday, 16 March, 15:35

Sheet C	1	2	3	4	5	6	7	8	EE	Final
South Korea (Seo) 🔨	0	2	0	2	0	0	0	2	0	6
Norway (Lorentsen)	1	0	3	0	0	0	2	0	2	8

Final

Saturday, 17 March, 14:35

Sheet B	1	2	3	4	5	6	7	8	EE	Final
China (Wang) 🔨	2	0	0	1	0	0	2	0	1	6
Norway (Lorentsen)	0	1	2	0	0	1	0	1	0	5
