= Hugh Nibloe =

Scottish and British wheelchair curler

- Curler
- Born: 9 January 1982 (age 44); Stranraer, Scotland

Team
- Curling club: Castle Kennedy Curling Club
- Skip: Hugh Nibloe
- Fourth: Gregor Ewan
- Second: Gary Logan
- Lead: Joanna Butterfield
- Alternate: Meggan Dawson-Farrell

Curling career
- Member Association: Scotland; United Kingdom
- World Wheelchair Championship: 8 (2015, 2017, 2019, 2020, 2021, 2023, 2024, 2025)
- World Wheelchair Mixed Doubles Championship: 1 (2025)
- Paralympic: 3 (2018, 2022, 2026)
Medal record
Wheelchair curling
Representing Scotland
World Wheelchair Championship
Silver medal – second place	2019 Sterling	Mixed Team
Bronze medal – third place	2017 Gangneung	Mixed Team
Bronze medal – third place	2023 Richmond	Mixed Team
World Mixed Doubles Championship
Silver medal – second place	2025 Stevenston	Mixed Doubles

Hugh Nibloe (born 9 January 1982 in Stranraer) is a Scottish wheelchair curler.

== Career ==
He participated at the 2018 Winter Paralympics, where British team finished in seventh place, and at the 2022 Winter Paralympics, where British team finished in eighth place.

== Teams ==
Season	Skip	Third	Second	Lead	Alternate	Coach	Events
2014–15	Gregor Ewan (Fourth)	Jim Gault	Hugh Nibloe	Aileen Neilson (Skip)	Angie Malone	Tony Zummack	WWhCC 2015 (8th)
2015–16	Aileen Neilson	Hugh Nibloe	Gregor Ewan	Angie Malone	Robert McPherson	Sheila Swan	WWhCC-B 2015 (5th)
2016–17	Aileen Neilson	Gregor Ewan	Hugh Nibloe	Robert McPherson	Angie Malone	Sheila Swan	WWhCC-B 2016 (silver); WWhCC 2017 (bronze)
2017–18	Aileen Neilson	Hugh Nibloe	Gregor Ewan	Bob McPherson	Angie Malone	Sheila Swan, Kenny More	WPG 2018 (7th)
2018–19	Aileen Neilson	Hugh Nibloe	Robert McPherson	David Melrose	Gary Logan	Sheila Swan	WWhCC 2019 (silver)
2019–20	Hugh Nibloe	Robert McPherson	Gary Smith	Charlotte McKenna	Meggan Dawson-Farrell	Sheila Swan	WWhCC 2020 (9th)
2021–22	Hugh Nibloe	Gregor Ewan	David Melrose	Meggan Dawson-Farrell	Charlotte McKenna, Gary Smith	Sheila Swan	WWhCC 2021 (6th); WPG 2022 (8th)
2022–23	Gregor Ewan (Fourth)	Hugh Nibloe (Skip)	Gary Logan	Jo Butterfield	Meggan Dawson-Farrell	Sheila Swan	WWhCC 2023 (bronze)
2023–24	Hugh Nibloe	Gregor Ewan	Gary Logan	Meggan Dawson-Farrell	Bob McPherson	Sheila Swan	WWhCC 2024 (10th)
2024–25	Hugh Nibloe	Gary Smith	Austin McKenzie	Jo Butterfield	Gregor Ewan	Sheila Swan	WWhCC 2025 (7th)
