= Justin Marshall (curler) =

American wheelchair curler and Paralympian

- Curler ♂
- Born: June 9, 1986 (age 40); Benson, Illinois, U.S.

Curling career
- Member Association: United States
- World Wheelchair Championship: 2 (2016, 2017)
- Paralympic: 1 (2018)
Medal record
Wheelchair curling

Justin Marshall (born June 9, 1986 in Benson, Illinois) is an American wheelchair curler.

He participated in the 2018 Winter Paralympics where American team finished on twelfth place.

== Teams ==
Season	Skip	Third	Second	Lead	Alternate	Coach	Events
2015–16	Patrick McDonald	Stephen Emt	James Joseph	Penny Greely	Justin Marshall	Steve Brown	WWhCC 2016 (6th)
2016–17	Stephen Emt	Kirk Black	Jimmy Joseph	Penny Greely	Justin Marshall	Steve Brown	WWhCC 2017 (7th)
2017–18	Kirk Black	Steve Emt	Justin Marshall	Penny Greely	Meghan Lino	Rusty Schieber, Tony Colacchio	WPG 2018 (12th)
