= Beatrix Blauel-Thomann =

Swiss wheelchair curler (born 1967)

- Curler ♀
- Other names: Beatrix Blauel, Beatrix Blaül, Beatrix Blaül-Thomann
- Born: 9 February 1967 (age 59)

Curling career
- Member Association: Switzerland
- World Wheelchair Championship: 2 (2016, 2017)
- Paralympic: 1 (2018)
Medal record
Wheelchair curling
Swiss Wheelchair Curling Championship
Gold medal – first place	2020 Brig

Beatrix Blauel-Thomann (born 9 February 1967) is a Swiss wheelchair curler.

She participated in the 2018 Winter Paralympics where Swiss team finished on sixth place.

== Teams ==
Season	Skip	Third	Second	Lead	Alternate	Coach	Events
2015–16	Felix Wagner	Eric Decorvet	Claudia Hüttenmoser	Beatrix Blauel	Marcel Bodenmann	Stephan Pfister	WWhCC 2016 (4th)
2016–17	Felix Wagner	Marcel Bodenmann	Claudia Hüttenmoser	Beatrix Blauel	Hans Burgener	Stephan Pfister	WWhCC 2017 (8th)
2017–18	Felix Wagner	Claudia Hüttenmoser	Marcel Bodenmann	Beatrix Blauel-Thomann	Hans Burgener	Stephan Pfister	WPG 2018 (6th)
2018–19	Günther Truog	Martin Vögtli	Beatrix Blauel	Christian Burkhalter	Eva Burgunder, Heinz Meier	Mark Steffen	SWhCC 2019 (5th)
2019–20	Claudia Hüttenmoser	Hampi Bieri	Beatrix Blauel	Claudia Baumgartner	Daniel Baumann	René Rohr	SWhCC 2020 (bronze)

=== Mixed doubles ===
Season	Female	Male	Coach	Events
2021–22	Beatrix Blauel-Thomann	Marcel Bodenmann	Stephan Pfister, Lukas Haggenmacher	WWhMDCC 2022 (...th)
