= Susanne Luchsinger =

Swiss curler and coach

- Curler ♀

Team
- Curling club: CC Wetzikon, Wetzikon

Curling career
- Member Association: Switzerland
- World Championship: 1 (1988)
Medal record
Curling
Swiss Women's Championship
Gold medal – first place	1988 Lausanne-Ouchy

Susanne Luchsinger is a former Swiss curler and curling coach.

At the national level, she is a Swiss women's champion curler (1988).

== Teams ==
Season	Skip	Third	Second	Lead	Events
1987–88	Erika Müller	Brigitte Kienast	Susanne Luchsinger	Regula Rüegg	SWCC 1988 (gold); WCC 1988 (6th)

== Record as a coach of club teams ==
Year	Tournament, event	Club team (Skip)	Place
2011	2011 Swiss Wheelchair Curling Championship	Wetzikon 2 (Max Brunner)	2nd place, silver medalist(s)
2011	2011 Swiss Wheelchair Curling Championship	Wetzikon 1 (Claudia Hüttenmoser)	3rd place, bronze medalist(s)
2012	2012 Swiss Wheelchair Curling Championship	RC Wetzikon 1 (Claudia Hüttenmoser)	1st place, gold medalist(s)
2013	2013 Swiss Wheelchair Curling Championship	CC Wetzikon 1 (Felix Wagner)	1st place, gold medalist(s)
2014	2014 Swiss Wheelchair Curling Championship	Wetzikon 1 (Felix Wagner)	3rd place, bronze medalist(s)
