= Kirk Black =

American wheelchair curler and Paralympian

- Curler ♂
- Born: June 30, 1969 (age 57); Texas, U.S.

Curling career
- Member Association: United States
- World Wheelchair Championship: 1 (2017)
- Paralympic: 1 (2018)
Medal record
Wheelchair curling

Kirk Black (born June 30, 1969 in Texas) is an American wheelchair curler.

He participated in the 2018 Winter Paralympics, where the American team finished in twelfth place.

== Teams ==
Season	Skip	Third	Second	Lead	Alternate	Coach	Events
2015–16	Patrick McDonald	Steve Emt	James Joseph	Kirk Black			
2016–17	Stephen Emt	Kirk Black	Jimmy Joseph	Penny Greely	Justin Marshall	Steve Brown	WWhCC 2017 (7th)
2017–18	Kirk Black	Steve Emt	Justin Marshall	Penny Greely	Meghan Lino	Rusty Schieber, Tony Colacchio	WPG 2018 (12th)
