= Kim Jong-pan =

South Korean wheelchair curler

- Curler ♂
- Born: January 29, 1970 (age 56); Seoul

Team
- Curling club: Uijeongbu Rolling Stone

Curling career
- Member Association: South Korea
- World Wheelchair Championship: 2 (2017, 2024)
- Paralympic: 1 (2014)
Medal record
Wheelchair curling

Kim Jong-pan(Korean: 김종판; born January 29, 1970 in Seoul) is a South Korean wheelchair curler.

He participated at the 2014 Winter Paralympics where South Korean team finished on ninth place. In 2017 World Wheelchair Curling Championship, he played as the part of South Korean team and finished sixth in the competition.

== Wheelchair curling teams and events ==
Season	Skip	Third	Second	Lead	Alternate	Coach	Events
2013–14	Kim Myung-jin	Kim Jong-pan	Seo Soon-seok	Kang Mi-suk	Yun Hee-keong	Ahn Jae-sung	WPG 2014 (9th)
2014–15	Kim Jong-pan	Seo Soon-seok	Jung Seung-won	Yun Hee-kyeong	Yang Hui-tae	Shin Kyung-yong	WWhCQ 2014 (4th)
2016–17	Kim Jong-pan	Seo Soon-seok	Cha Jae-goan	Cho Min-kyong	Lee Dong-ha	Beak Jong-chul	WWhCC 2017 (6th)
