= David Melrose =

Scottish wheelchair curler

- Curler
- Born: 2 March 1966 (age 60); Haddington, Scotland

Team
- Curling club: Aberdeen CC, Aberdeen

Curling career
- Member Association: Scotland
- World Wheelchair Championship: 1 (2019)
- Paralympic: 1 (2022)
Medal record
Wheelchair curling
Representing Scotland
World Wheelchair Championship
Silver medal – second place	2019 Sterling

David Melrose (born 2 March 1966) is a Scottish wheelchair curler. He competed for Great Britain at the 2022 Winter Paralympics.

== Teams ==
Season	Skip	Third	Second	Lead	Alternate	Coach	Events
2016–17	Stewart Pimblett	Gary Logan	David Melrose	Christine Warwick			SWhCC 2017 (7th)
2018–19	Aileen Neilson	Hugh Nibloe	Robert McPherson	David Melrose	Gary Logan	Sheila Swan	WWhCC 2019 (silver)
2021–22	Hugh Nibloe	Gregor Ewan	David Melrose	Meggan Dawson-Farrell	Charlotte McKenna	Sheila Swan	WWhCC 2021 (6th)
2021–22	Gregor Ewan (fourth)	Hugh Nibloe (skip)	David Melrose	Meggan Dawson-Farrell	Gary Smith	Sheila Swan	WPG 2022 (8th)

=== Mixed doubles ===
Season	Female	Male	Coach	Events
2022–23	Charlotte McKenna	David Melrose	Robin Brydone, Kenny More	WWhMDCC 2023 (8th)
