= Marcel Bodenmann =

Swiss wheelchair curler and Paralympian

- Curler ♂
- Born: 19 November 1966 (age 59)

Curling career
- Member Association: Switzerland
- World Wheelchair Championship: 2 (2016, 2017)
- Paralympic: 1 (2018)
Medal record
Wheelchair curling

Marcel Bodenmann (born 19 November 1966) is a Swiss wheelchair curler.

He participated in the 2018 Winter Paralympics where Swiss team finished on sixth place.

== Teams ==
Season	Skip	Third	Second	Lead	Alternate	Coach	Events
2015–16	Felix Wagner	Eric Decorvet	Claudia Hüttenmoser	Beatrix Blaül	Marcel Bodenmann	Stephan Pfister	WWhCC 2016 (4th)
2016–17	Felix Wagner	Marcel Bodenmann	Claudia Hüttenmoser	Beatrix Blaül	Hans Burgener	Stephan Pfister	WWhCC 2017 (8th)
2017–18	Felix Wagner	Claudia Hüttenmoser	Marcel Bodenmann	Beatrix Blaül	Hans Burgener	Stephan Pfister	WPG 2018 (6th)
2018–19	Marcel Bodenmann	Harry Pavel	Werner Locher	Marlise Schwitter	Vroni Forrer, Daniel Schühle	Peter Nater, Lorna Rettig	SWhCC 2019 (4th)
2019–20	Felix Wagner	Marcel Bodenmann	Marlise Schwitter	Daniel Schuehle			
2019–20	Marcel Bodenmann	Daniel Schühle	Werner Locher	Marlise Schwitter	Oskar Thomann	Harry Burger	SWhCC 2020 (4th)

=== Mixed doubles ===
Season	Female	Male	Coach	Events
2021–22	Beatrix Blauel-Thomann	Marcel Bodenmann	Stephan Pfister, Lukas Haggenmacher	WWhMDCC 2022 (...th)
