= 2020 Swiss Wheelchair Curling Championship =

- Host city: Brig
- Dates: February 6–9
- Winner: Crans Montana Tor
- Skip: Raymond Pfyffer
- Third: Hans Burgener
- Second: Françoise Jaquerod
- Lead: Bernard Moriset
- Alternate: Patrick Delacretaz
- Finalist: Lausanne Olympique (Eric Décorvet)

The 2020 Swiss Wheelchair Curling Championship was held from February 6 to 9, 2020 in Brig.

== Teams ==
Team	Skip	Third	Second	Lead	Alternate	Coach
Crans Montana Tor	Raymond Pfyffer	Hans Burgener	Françoise Jaquerod	Bernard Moriset	Patrick Delacretaz	
Genève	Mina Carina Mojtahedi	Laurent Kneubühl	Olivier Godinat	Olivier Joseph	Cedric Fillettaz	Cathy Crottaz, Michel Bise
Lausanne Olympique	Eric Décorvet	Didier Recordon	Léo Gottet	Mélanie Villars	Adelah Al-Roumi	Christian Gringet
St. Gallen 1	Claudia Hüttenmoser	Hampi Bieri	Beatrix Blauel	Claudia Baumgartner	Daniel Baumann	René Rohr
St. Gallen 2	Ivo Hasler	Christine Betschart	Ewald Bannwart	Brigitte Huber	Heinz Bänziger	René Rohr
Wetzikon	Marcel Bodenmann	Daniel Schühle	Werner Locher	Marlise Schwitter	Oskar Thomann	Harry Burger

== Round-robin results and standings ==
Key
Teams to Playoffs

	Team (Skip)	A1	A2	A3	A4	A5	A6	W	L	Place
A1	Crans Montana Tor (Raymond Pfyffer)	*	12:8	9:7	6:5	10:2	12:4	5	0	1
A2	Genève (Mina Carina Mojtahedi)	8:12	*	2:16	2:9	2:13	7:8	0	5	6
A3	Lausanne Olympique (Eric Décorvet)	7:9	16:2	*	8:7	12:2	10:4	4	1	2
A4	St. Gallen 1 (Claudia Hüttenmoser)	5:6	9:2	7:8	*	7:1	6:8	2	3	4
A5	St. Gallen 2 (Ivo Hasler)	2:10	13:2	2:12	1:7	*	4:11	1	4	5
A6	Wetzikon (Marcel Bodenmann)	4:12	8:7	4:10	8:6	11:4	*	3	2	3

== Playoffs ==
Semifinals
1	Crans Montana Tor (Raymond Pfyffer)	9
4	St. Gallen 1 (Claudia Hüttenmoser)	3
2	Lausanne Olympique (Eric Décorvet)	8
3	Wetzikon (Marcel Bodenmann)	2

Final
Crans Montana Tor (Raymond Pfyffer)	9
Lausanne Olympique (Eric Décorvet)	8
Bronze medal game
St. Gallen 1 (Claudia Hüttenmoser)	9
Wetzikon (Marcel Bodenmann)	2

=== Semifinals ===
Sunday, February 9, 9:00 am

Sheet B	1	2	3	4	5	6	7	8	Final
Crans Montana Tor (Raymond Pfyffer)	1	0	1	2	0	1	4	X	9
St. Gallen 1 (Claudia Hüttenmoser)	0	2	0	0	1	0	0	X	3

Sheet D	1	2	3	4	5	6	7	8	Final
Lausanne Olympique (Eric Décorvet)	2	3	0	1	0	1	1	X	8
Wetzikon (Marcel Bodenmann)	0	0	1	0	1	0	0	X	2

=== Classification for 5th place ===
Sunday, February 9, 1:30 pm

Sheet D	1	2	3	4	5	6	7	8	Final
Genève (Mina Carina Mojtahedi)	0	1	0	0	2	0	0	1	4
St. Gallen 2 (Ivo Hasler)	1	0	1	1	0	1	1	0	5

=== Bronze medal game ===
Sunday, February 9, 1:30 am

Sheet B	1	2	3	4	5	6	7	8	Final
St. Gallen 1 (Claudia Hüttenmoser)	1	0	4	1	1	0	2	X	9
Wetzikon (Marcel Bodenmann)	0	1	0	0	0	1	0	X	2

=== Final ===
Sunday, February 9, 1:30 am

Sheet C	1	2	3	4	5	6	7	8	Final
Lausanne Olympique (Eric Décorvet)	0	0	2	0	4	0	0	2	8
Crans Montana Tor (Raymond Pfyffer)	2	1	0	1	0	3	2	0	9

== Final standings ==
Place	Team	Skip	Games	Wins	Losses
1st place, gold medalist(s)	Crans Montana Tor	Raymond Pfyffer	7	7	0
2nd place, silver medalist(s)	Lausanne Olympique	Eric Décorvet	7	5	2
3rd place, bronze medalist(s)	St. Gallen 1	Claudia Hüttenmoser	7	3	4
4	Wetzikon	Marcel Bodenmann	7	3	4
5	St. Gallen 2	Ivo Hasler	6	2	4
6	Genève	Mina Carina Mojtahedi	6	0	6
