= 2020 World Wheelchair-B Curling Championship =

- Host city: Lohja, Finland
- Arena: Kisakallio Sports Institute
- Dates: April 10–15, 2021
- Winner: United States
- Skip: Matthew Thums
- Third: Stephen Emt
- Second: David Samsa
- Lead: Pamela Wilson
- Alternate: Batoyun Uranchimeg
- Coach: Russell Schieber
- Finalist: Switzerland (Décorvet)

The 2020 World Wheelchair-B Curling Championship was held from April 10 to 15, 2021 in Lohja, Finland. The top three placing teams qualified for the 2021 World Wheelchair Curling Championship in Beijing, China. The United States won the gold medal, defeating the previously undefeated Switzerland 4–3 in the final. Italy took the bronze medal and final berth at the 2021 World Championship with an 8–4 win over Germany in the bronze medal game.

== Teams ==
The teams are as follows:

Czech Republic	Estonia	Finland	Germany	Hungary
Skip: Dana Selnekovičová; Third: Martin Tluk; Second: Milan Bartůněk; Lead: Jana Břinčilová; Alternate: Radek Coufal	Skip: Andrei Koitmäe; Third: Ain Villau; Second: Mait Mätas; Lead: Signe Falkenberg; Alternate: Katlin Riidebach	Fourth: Pekka Pälsynaho; Skip: Juha Rajala; Second: Teemu Klasila; Lead: Riitta Särösalo; Alternate: Ritva Lampinen	Skip: Christiane Putzich; Third: Burkhard Möller; Second: Wolf Meißner; Lead: Melanie Spielmann; Alternate: Christoph Gemmer	Fourth: Péter Barkóczi; Skip: Viktor Beke; Second: Anikó Sasadi; Lead: Rita Sárai
Italy	Japan	Switzerland	Turkey	United States
Fourth: Egidio Marchese; Third: Orietta Berto; Second: Fabrizio Bich; Skip: Angela Menardi; Alternate: Matteo Ronzani	Skip: Hidenori Suzuki; Third: Yuri Muramatsu; Second: Haruo Matsuhashi; Lead: Ayako Saitoh; Alternate: Hiromi Takahashi	Skip: Eric Décorvet; Third: Hans Burgener; Second: Françoise Jaquerod; Lead: Laurent Kneubühl; Alternate: Patrick Delacrétaz	Fourth: Züleyha Bingöl; Third: Kenan Coşkun; Second: Turan Akalın; Skip: Savaş Şimşek; Alternate: Serdal Pamaz	Skip: Matthew Thums; Third: Stephen Emt; Second: David Samsa; Lead: Pamela Wilson; Alternate: Batoyun Uranchimeg

== Round-robin standings ==
Final round-robin standings

Key
Teams to Playoffs

Team	Skip	W	L	W–L	DSC
Switzerland	Eric Décorvet	9	0	–	131.95
Italy	Angela Menardi	7	2	1–0	130.93
United States	Matthew Thums	7	2	0–1	151.50
Germany	Christiane Putzich	6	3	1–0	136.95
Estonia	Andrei Koitmäe	6	3	0–1	142.70
Finland	Juha Rajala	4	5	–	150.58
Czech Republic	Dana Selnekovičová	2	7	1–1	133.30
Turkey	Savaş Şimşek	2	7	1–1	134.38
Japan	Hidenori Suzuki	2	7	1–1	134.43
Hungary	Viktor Beke	0	9	–	124.98

== Round-robin results ==
All draw times are listed in Eastern European Summer Time (UTC+03:00).

=== Draw 1 ===
Saturday, April 10, 2:30 pm

Sheet A	1	2	3	4	5	6	7	8	Final
Hungary (Beke) 🔨	0	1	1	0	0	0	3	X	5
Czech Republic (Selnekovičová)	1	0	0	3	5	3	0	X	12

Sheet B	1	2	3	4	5	6	7	8	Final
Switzerland (Décorvet) 🔨	1	0	3	0	2	0	0	1	7
Germany (Putzich)	0	1	0	2	0	1	1	0	5

=== Draw 2 ===
Saturday, April 10, 6:30 pm

Sheet A	1	2	3	4	5	6	7	8	Final
Japan (Suzuki) 🔨	0	0	1	0	1	0	0	X	2
United States (Thums)	3	2	0	1	0	3	1	X	10

Sheet B	1	2	3	4	5	6	7	8	Final
Finland (Rajala) 🔨	0	0	2	0	0	1	0	X	3
Estonia (Koitmäe)	3	1	0	1	1	0	3	X	9

Sheet D	1	2	3	4	5	6	7	8	Final
Turkey (Şimşek)	0	0	0	3	0	0	2	X	5
Italy (Menardi) 🔨	2	4	1	0	1	0	0	X	8

=== Draw 3 ===
Sunday, April 11, 9:30 am

Sheet A	1	2	3	4	5	6	7	8	Final
Turkey (Şimşek)	3	0	1	0	1	2	2	X	9
Hungary (Beke) 🔨	0	3	0	2	0	0	0	X	5

Sheet B	1	2	3	4	5	6	7	8	EE	Final
Japan (Suzuki)	0	0	2	1	0	0	2	0	0	5
Switzerland (Décorvet) 🔨	1	1	0	0	1	2	0	0	1	6

Sheet D	1	2	3	4	5	6	7	8	Final
Estonia (Koitmäe) 🔨	1	0	1	0	0	1	0	X	3
United States (Thums)	0	2	0	1	1	0	1	X	5

=== Draw 4 ===
Sunday, April 11, 2:00 pm

Sheet A	1	2	3	4	5	6	7	8	Final
Finland (Rajala) 🔨	0	3	2	2	0	3	X	X	10
Turkey (Şimşek)	2	0	0	0	1	0	X	X	3

Sheet B	1	2	3	4	5	6	7	8	Final
Germany (Putzich) 🔨	0	0	1	0	0	1	0	X	2
United States (Thums)	0	0	0	2	3	0	2	X	7

Sheet C	1	2	3	4	5	6	7	8	Final
Estonia (Koitmäe)	0	3	1	1	1	2	X	X	8
Czech Republic (Selnekovičová) 🔨	1	0	0	0	0	0	X	X	1

Sheet D	1	2	3	4	5	6	7	8	Final
Switzerland (Décorvet) 🔨	1	0	2	0	0	0	1	1	5
Italy (Menardi)	0	1	0	1	1	1	0	0	4

=== Draw 5 ===
Sunday, April 11, 6:30 pm

Sheet A	1	2	3	4	5	6	7	8	Final
Czech Republic (Selnekovičová)	2	0	0	0	1	0	0	X	3
Germany (Putzich) 🔨	0	3	1	2	0	1	1	X	8

Sheet C	1	2	3	4	5	6	7	8	Final
Finland (Rajala)	2	0	0	1	0	0	0	X	3
Italy (Menardi) 🔨	0	1	1	0	4	2	2	X	10

Sheet D	1	2	3	4	5	6	7	8	Final
Japan (Suzuki) 🔨	2	0	0	4	1	0	1	X	8
Hungary (Beke)	0	1	2	0	0	1	0	X	4

=== Draw 6 ===
Monday, April 12, 9:30 am

Sheet B	1	2	3	4	5	6	7	8	Final
Finland (Rajala) 🔨	0	2	0	1	2	2	2	X	9
Japan (Suzuki)	3	0	1	0	0	0	0	X	4

Sheet C	1	2	3	4	5	6	7	8	Final
Germany (Putzich) 🔨	1	0	0	1	0	3	0	1	6
Estonia (Koitmäe)	0	0	1	0	1	0	1	0	3

Sheet D	1	2	3	4	5	6	7	8	Final
United States (Thums)	0	0	1	1	1	0	3	1	7
Czech Republic (Selnekovičová) 🔨	3	2	0	0	0	1	0	0	6

=== Draw 7 ===
Monday, April 12, 2:00 pm

Sheet A	1	2	3	4	5	6	7	8	Final
Italy (Menardi)	0	1	3	2	2	2	X	X	10
Japan (Suzuki) 🔨	0	0	0	0	0	0	X	X	0

Sheet B	1	2	3	4	5	6	7	8	Final
Turkey (Şimşek)	0	0	2	0	1	0	0	X	3
United States (Thums) 🔨	0	3	0	1	0	1	1	X	6

Sheet C	1	2	3	4	5	6	7	8	Final
Switzerland (Décorvet)	0	1	3	0	0	2	0	0	6
Hungary (Beke) 🔨	1	0	0	1	1	0	1	1	5

=== Draw 8 ===
Monday, April 12, 6:30 pm

Sheet A	1	2	3	4	5	6	7	8	Final
Switzerland (Décorvet)	2	0	3	3	0	1	0	X	9
Estonia (Koitmäe) 🔨	0	1	0	0	3	0	2	X	6

Sheet B	1	2	3	4	5	6	7	8	Final
Hungary (Beke) 🔨	1	0	1	0	0	1	0	X	3
Finland (Rajala)	0	4	0	3	3	0	2	X	12

Sheet C	1	2	3	4	5	6	7	8	Final
Italy (Menardi) 🔨	0	0	0	1	2	0	0	2	5
Czech Republic (Selnekovičová)	1	1	0	0	0	1	0	0	3

Sheet D	1	2	3	4	5	6	7	8	Final
Germany (Putzich)	0	0	1	2	1	0	1	0	5
Turkey (Şimşek) 🔨	2	1	0	0	0	1	0	0	4

=== Draw 9 ===
Tuesday, April 13, 9:30 am

Sheet B	1	2	3	4	5	6	7	8	Final
Italy (Menardi)	0	1	2	1	1	1	0	2	8
Hungary (Beke) 🔨	4	0	0	0	0	0	2	0	6

Sheet C	1	2	3	4	5	6	7	8	Final
Switzerland (Décorvet)	0	2	3	0	2	0	1	X	8
Turkey (Şimşek) 🔨	1	0	0	1	0	1	0	X	3

Sheet D	1	2	3	4	5	6	7	8	Final
Czech Republic (Selnekovičová) 🔨	0	0	1	0	0	0	X	X	1
Finland (Rajala)	3	0	0	3	3	4	X	X	13

=== Draw 10 ===
Tuesday, April 13, 2:00 pm

Sheet A	1	2	3	4	5	6	7	8	Final
Germany (Putzich) 🔨	2	0	3	0	0	0	0	1	6
Finland (Rajala)	0	1	0	2	1	1	0	0	5

Sheet B	1	2	3	4	5	6	7	8	Final
Japan (Suzuki) 🔨	0	4	0	0	2	0	1	2	9
Czech Republic (Selnekovičová)	1	0	1	1	0	2	0	0	5

Sheet C	1	2	3	4	5	6	7	8	Final
Hungary (Beke)	0	1	0	1	0	1	0	X	3
United States (Thums) 🔨	1	0	4	0	1	0	1	X	7

Sheet D	1	2	3	4	5	6	7	8	Final
Italy (Menardi)	1	0	0	0	0	1	0	X	2
Estonia (Koitmäe) 🔨	0	0	1	1	0	0	2	X	4

=== Draw 11 ===
Tuesday, April 13, 6:30 pm

Sheet A	1	2	3	4	5	6	7	8	Final
United States (Thums)	0	0	1	1	1	1	0	0	4
Switzerland (Décorvet) 🔨	1	1	0	0	0	0	1	2	5

Sheet B	1	2	3	4	5	6	7	8	Final
Estonia (Koitmäe)	1	0	1	1	2	0	0	X	5
Turkey (Şimşek) 🔨	0	1	0	0	0	0	1	X	2

Sheet C	1	2	3	4	5	6	7	8	EE	Final
Japan (Suzuki) 🔨	2	0	1	0	0	1	1	0	0	5
Germany (Putzich)	0	0	0	1	1	0	0	3	3	8

=== Draw 12 ===
Wednesday, April 14, 9:30 am

Sheet B	1	2	3	4	5	6	7	8	Final
United States (Thums)	0	4	0	0	0	1	1	0	6
Italy (Menardi) 🔨	1	0	2	2	1	0	0	2	8

Sheet C	1	2	3	4	5	6	7	8	Final
Czech Republic (Selnekovičová) 🔨	1	0	0	0	0	0	X	X	1
Switzerland (Décorvet)	0	1	1	2	3	2	X	X	9

Sheet D	1	2	3	4	5	6	7	8	Final
Hungary (Beke) 🔨	3	0	0	1	1	0	0	0	5
Germany (Putzich)	0	1	1	0	0	1	2	1	6

=== Draw 13 ===
Wednesday, April 14, 2:00 pm

Sheet A	1	2	3	4	5	6	7	8	Final
Germany (Putzich) 🔨	0	2	1	0	1	0	2	0	6
Italy (Menardi)	1	0	0	3	0	3	0	0	7

Sheet B	1	2	3	4	5	6	7	8	Final
Czech Republic (Selnekovičová)	5	0	0	0	0	3	1	X	9
Turkey (Şimşek) 🔨	0	1	1	1	1	0	0	X	4

Sheet C	1	2	3	4	5	6	7	8	Final
United States (Thums) 🔨	0	1	0	3	1	0	0	X	5
Finland (Rajala)	0	0	1	0	0	0	1	X	2

Sheet D	1	2	3	4	5	6	7	8	Final
Estonia (Koitmäe) 🔨	0	2	0	0	0	3	1	X	6
Japan (Suzuki)	0	0	1	0	1	0	0	X	2

=== Draw 14 ===
Wednesday, April 14, 6:30 pm

Sheet A	1	2	3	4	5	6	7	8	Final
Estonia (Koitmäe) 🔨	2	4	0	1	2	0	2	X	11
Hungary (Beke)	0	0	1	0	0	1	0	X	2

Sheet C	1	2	3	4	5	6	7	8	Final
Turkey (Şimşek)	1	0	4	2	1	2	0	X	10
Japan (Suzuki) 🔨	0	2	0	0	0	0	1	X	3

Sheet D	1	2	3	4	5	6	7	8	Final
Finland (Rajala)	0	1	0	3	0	0	0	1	5
Switzerland (Décorvet) 🔨	1	0	3	0	2	1	1	0	8

== Playoffs ==
Semifinals
1	Switzerland	8
4	Germany	2
2	Italy	5
3	United States	6

Final
1	Switzerland	3
3	United States	4
Bronze medal game
4	Germany	4
2	Italy	8

=== Semifinals ===
Thursday, April 15, 10:00 am

Sheet B	1	2	3	4	5	6	7	8	Final
Switzerland (Décorvet) 🔨	0	1	0	0	1	2	4	X	8
Germany (Putzich)	0	0	0	2	0	0	0	X	2

Sheet D	1	2	3	4	5	6	7	8	EE	Final
Italy (Menardi) 🔨	1	1	0	0	0	0	2	1	0	5
United States (Thums)	0	0	2	1	1	1	0	0	1	6

=== Bronze medal game ===
Thursday, April 15, 3:00 pm

Sheet C	1	2	3	4	5	6	7	8	Final
Germany (Putzich)	1	0	0	0	3	0	0	X	4
Italy (Menardi) 🔨	0	1	1	1	0	4	1	X	8

=== Final ===
Thursday, April 15, 3:00 pm

Sheet A	1	2	3	4	5	6	7	8	Final
Switzerland (Décorvet) 🔨	0	0	1	1	1	0	0	0	3
United States (Thums)	0	0	0	0	0	2	1	1	4
