= Anton Kehrli =

Swiss wheelchair curler and Paralympian

- Curler ♂
- Born: 4 March 1957 (age 69)

Curling career
- Member Association: Switzerland
- World Wheelchair Championship: 1 (2009)
- Paralympic: 1 (2010)
Medal record
Wheelchair curling

Anton Kehrli (born 4 March 1957) is a Swiss wheelchair curler.

He participated in the 2010 Winter Paralympics where Swiss team finished seventh place.

== Teams ==
Season	Skip	Third	Second	Lead	Alternate	Coach	Events
2008–09	Manfred Bolliger	Martin Bieri	Daniel Meyer	Anton Kehrli	Melanie Villars	Anton Ruesser, Nadia Röthlisberger-Raspe	WWhCC 2009 (10th)
2009–10	Manfred Bolliger	Claudia Hüttenmoser	Daniel Meyer	Anton Kehrli	Martin Bieri	Nadia Röthlisberger-Raspe	WPG 2010 (7th)
2012–13	Felix Wagner	Claudia Hüttenmoser	Eric Decorvet	Anton Kehrli	Mireille Gauthey	Stephan Pfister	WWhCQ 2012 (7th)
