= Martin Bieri =

Swiss wheelchair curler and Paralympian

- Curler ♂
- Born: 25 September 1961 (age 65)

Curling career
- Member Association: Switzerland
- World Wheelchair Championship: 1 (2009)
- Paralympic: 1 (2010)
Medal record
Wheelchair curling

Martin Bieri (born 25 September 1961) is a Swiss wheelchair curler.

He participated in the 2010 Winter Paralympics where Swiss team finished on seventh place.

== Teams ==
| Season | Skip | Third | Second | Lead | Alternate | Coach | Events |
|---|---|---|---|---|---|---|---|
| 2008–09 | Manfred Bolliger | Martin Bieri | Daniel Meyer | Anton Kehrli | Melanie Villars | Anton Ruesser, Nadia Röthlisberger-Raspe | WWhCC 2009 (10th) |
| 2009–10 | Manfred Bolliger | Claudia Hüttenmoser | Daniel Meyer | Anton Kehrli | Martin Bieri | Nadia Röthlisberger-Raspe | WPG 2010 (7th) |
| 2010–11 | Manfred Bolliger | Claudia Hüttenmoser | Hieronymus Liechtenhan | Daniel Meyer | Martin Bieri | Stephan Pfister | WWhCQ 2010 (5th) |
| 2018–19 | Daniel Meyer | Martin Bieri | Heinz Gertsch | Marianne Läderach | Adela Al-Roumi | | SWhCC 2019 (8th) |
