= Claudia Hüttenmoser =

Swiss wheelchair curler and Paralympian

- Curler ♀
- Born: 9 August 1967 (age 59)

Curling career
- Member Association: Switzerland
- World Wheelchair Championship: 2 (2016, 2017)
- Paralympic: 2 (2010, 2018)
Medal record
Wheelchair curling
Swiss Wheelchair Curling Championship
Silver medal – second place	2019 St. Gallen
Bronze medal – third place	2020 Brig

Claudia Hüttenmoser-Pfister (born 9 August 1967) is a Swiss wheelchair curler.

She participated in the 2010 and 2018 Winter Paralympics where Swiss team finished on seventh and sixth places respectively.

== Teams ==
Season	Skip	Third	Second	Lead	Alternate	Coach	Events
2009–10	Manfred Bolliger	Claudia Hüttenmoser	Daniel Meyer	Anton Kehrli	Martin Bieri	Nadia Röthlisberger-Raspe	WPG 2010 (7th)
2010–11	Manfred Bolliger	Claudia Hüttenmoser	Hieronymus Liechtenhan	Daniel Meyer	Martin Bieri	Stephan Pfister	WWhCQ 2010 (5th)
2011–12	Manfred Bolliger	Felix Wagner	Claudia Hüttenmoser	Eric Decorvet	Melanie Villars	Stephan Pfister	WWhCQ 2011 (5th)
2012–13	Felix Wagner	Claudia Hüttenmoser	Eric Decorvet	Anton Kehrli	Mireille Gauthey	Stephan Pfister	WWhCQ 2012 (7th)
2014–15	Felix Wagner	Eric Decorvet	Claudia Hüttenmoser	Ivo Hasler	Mireille Gauthey	Stephan Pfister	WWhCQ 2014 (7th)
2015–16	Felix Wagner	Eric Decorvet	Claudia Hüttenmoser	Beatrix Blaül	Marcel Bodenmann	Stephan Pfister	WWhCC 2016 (4th)
2016–17	Felix Wagner	Marcel Bodenmann	Claudia Hüttenmoser	Beatrix Blaül	Hans Burgener	Stephan Pfister	WWhCC 2017 (8th)
2017–18	Felix Wagner	Claudia Hüttenmoser	Marcel Bodenmann	Beatrix Blaül	Hans Burgener	Stephan Pfister	WPG 2018 (6th)
2018–19	Claudia Hüttenmoser	Claudia Baumgartner	Hanspeter Bieri	Daniel Baumann		Manuela Haas, René Rohr	SWhCC 2019 (silver)
2019–20	Claudia Hüttenmoser	Hampi Bieri	Beatrix Blaül	Claudia Baumgartner	Daniel Baumann	René Rohr	SWhCC 2020 (bronze)
