= Lee Dong-ha (curler) =

South Korean wheelchair curler

- Curler ♂
- Born: December 5, 1973 (age 52)

Curling career
- Member Association: South Korea
- World Wheelchair Championship: 1 (2017)
- Paralympic: 1 (2018)
Medal record
Wheelchair curling

Lee Dong-ha(Korean: 이동하; born December 5, 1973) is a South Korean wheelchair curler.

He participated at the 2018 Winter Paralympics where South Korean team finished on fourth place.

== Wheelchair curling teams and events ==
Season	Skip	Third	Second	Lead	Alternate	Coach	Events
2016–17	Kim Jong-pan	Seo Soon-seok	Cha Jae-goan	Cho Min-kyong	Lee Dong-ha	Beak Jong-chul	WWhCC 2017 (6th)
2017–18	Cha Jae-goan (fourth)	Jung Seung-won	Seo Soon-seok (skip)	Bang Min-ja	Lee Dong-ha	Beak Jong-chul, Hwang Hyeon-jun	WPG 2018 (4th)
