= Wheelchair curling at the 2018 Winter Paralympics =

Wheelchair curling at the XII Paralympic Winter Games
- Venue: Gangneung Gymnasium
- Dates: 10–17 March
- Competitors: 60 from 12 nations

Medalists
1st place, gold medalist(s)		China
2nd place, silver medalist(s)		Norway
3rd place, bronze medalist(s)		Canada

The wheelchair curling competition of the 2018 Winter Paralympics was held from 10 to 17 March 2018 at the Gangneung Gymnasium in Gangneung, South Korea. For the first time, twelve mixed teams will compete at the Winter Paralympics.

== Medal summary ==
=== Medal table ===
Rank	Nation	Gold	Silver	Bronze	Total
1	China	1	0	0	1
2	Norway	0	1	0	1
3	Canada	0	0	1	1
Totals (3 entries)		1	1	1	3

=== Medalists ===
Event	Gold	Silver	Bronze
Mixed	China; Wang Haitao; Chen Jianxin; Liu Wei; Wang Meng; Zhang Qiang (alternate); Coach: Yue Qingshuang	Norway; Rune Lorentsen; Jostein Stordahl; Ole Fredrik Syversen; Sissel Løchen; Rikke Iversen (alternate); Coach: Peter Dahlman	Canada; Mark Ideson; Ina Forrest; Dennis Thiessen; Marie Wright; James Anseeuw (alternate); Coach: Wayne Kiel

== Qualification ==
Qualification for the 2018 Paralympics was based on rankings in the 2015, 2016, and 2017 World Wheelchair Curling Championships. The qualification points are allotted based on the nations' final rankings at the World Championships. The points are distributed as shown in the table below. The eleven countries with the most points were to qualify for the Pyeongchang Games, while the twelfth slot was reserved for the host country, South Korea. Because the South Korean team placed within the top eleven point-scorers, the twelfth slot was given to the twelfth-ranked team, Sweden.

Final rank	1	2	3	4	5	6	7	8	9	10
Points	12	10	8	7	6	5	4	3	2	1

=== Rankings ===
Key
Nations qualified for the Paralympic Games
Host nation (automatic qualification)

Country	(Finland) 2015	(Switzerland) 2016	(South Korea) 2017	Total
Neutral Paralympic Athletes	12	12	10	34
Norway	1	10	12	23
China	10	6	7	23
Canada	5	4	6	15
United States	6	5	4	15
South Korea	0	8	5	13
Great Britain^{1}	3	0	8	11
Switzerland	0	7	3	10
Finland	8	1	1	10
Germany	4	3	2	9
Slovakia	7	2	0	9
Sweden	2	0	0	2

Notes

1. Scotland, England and Wales all compete separately at the World Wheelchair Curling Championship. Under an agreement between the curling federations of those three home nations, only qualification points earned by Scotland count toward the point total for Great Britain.

== Teams ==
The teams are listed as follows:

Canada	China	Finland	Germany
Skip: Mark Ideson; Third: Ina Forrest; Second: Dennis Thiessen; Lead: Marie Wright; Alternate: James Anseeuw; Coach: Wayne Kiel	Skip: Wang Haitao; Third: Chen Jianxin; Second: Liu Wei; Lead: Wang Meng; Alternate: Zhang Qiang; Coach: Yue Qingshuang	Fourth: Markku Karjalainen; Third: Yrjö Jääskeläinen; Second: Vesa Leppänen; Skip: Sari Karjalainen; Alternate: Riitta Särösalo; Coach: Vesa Kokko	Skip: Christiane Putzich; Third: Harry Pavel; Second: Martin Schlitt; Lead: Heike Melchior; Alternate: Wolf Meissner; Coach: Katja Schweizer
Great Britain	Norway	Neutral Paralympic Athletes	Slovakia
Skip: Aileen Neilson; Third: Hugh Nibloe; Second: Gregor Ewan; Lead: Bob McPherson; Alternate: Angie Malone; Coach: Sheila Swan, Kenny More	Skip: Rune Lorentsen; Third: Jostein Stordahl; Second: Ole Fredrik Syversen; Lead: Sissel Løchen; Alternate: Rikke Iversen; Coach: Peter Dahlman	Skip: Konstantin Kurokhtin; Third: Marat Romanov; Second: Alexander Shevchenko; Lead: Daria Shchukina; Alternate: Andrei Meshcheriakov; Coach: Anton Batugin	Fourth: Dušan Pitoňák; Skip: Radoslav Ďuriš; Second: Peter Zaťko; Lead: Monika Kunkelová; Alternate: Imrich Lyócsa; Coach: Frantisek Pitonak, Pavol Pitonak
South Korea	Sweden	Switzerland	United States
Fourth: Cha Jae-goan; Third: Jung Seung-won; Skip: Seo Soon-seok; Lead: Bang Min-ja; Alternate: Lee Dong-ha; Coach: Beak Jong-chul, Hwang Hyeon-jun	Skip: Viljo Petersson Dahl; Third: Ronny Persson; Second: Mats-Ola Engborg; Lead: Kicki Ulander; Alternate: Zandra Reppe; Coach: Peter Narup, Mia Boman	Skip: Felix Wagner; Third: Claudia Hüttenmoser; Second: Marcel Bodenmann; Lead: Beatrix Blauel-Thomann; Alternate: Hans Burgener; Coach: Stephan Pfister	Skip: Kirk Black; Third: Steve Emt; Second: Justin Marshall; Lead: Penny Greely; Alternate: Meghan Lino; Coach: Rusty Schieber, Tony Colacchio

== Standings ==
Pos	Team	Pld	W	L	PF	PA	PD	PCT	Ends Won	Ends Lost	Blank Ends	Stolen Ends	Shot %	Qualification	(South Korea)	(Canada)	(China)	(Norway)	Neutral Paralympic Athletes at the 2018 Winter Paralympics	(Switzerland)	(United Kingdom)	(Germany)	(Slovakia)	(Sweden)	(Finland)	(United States)
1	South Korea	11	9	2	65	51	14	0.818	38	36	9	11	66%	Advance to playoffs	—	7–5	7–6	2–9	6–5	6–5	5–4	3–4	7–5	4–2	11–3	7–3
2	Canada	11	9	2	74	45	29	0.818	47	28	6	27	62%	Advance to playoffs	5–7	—	8–5	10–1	5–4	8–0	1–8	6–2	9–5	8–4	8–4	6–5
3	China	11	9	2	85	42	43	0.818	43	32	2	16	67%	Advance to playoffs	6–7	5–8	—	10–1	10–4	8–2	9–3	7–3	9–2	9–4	6–4	6–4
4	Norway	11	7	4	55	57	−2	0.636	41	35	5	15	58%	Advance to playoffs	9–2	1–10	1–10	—	6–2	6–3	2–5	8–6	7–6	4–5	6–4	5–4
5	Neutral Paralympic Athletes	11	5	6	61	63	−2	0.455	44	37	2	23	62%		5–6	4–5	4–10	2–6	—	6–4	8–2	4–9	7–5	3–7	12–5	6–4
6	Switzerland	11	5	6	56	63	−7	0.455	36	45	2	11	61%		5–6	0–8	2–8	3–6	4–6	—	7–4	9–4	6–5	3–5	10–7	7–4
7	Great Britain	11	5	6	57	53	4	0.455	41	41	6	20	62%		4–5	8–1	3–9	5–2	2–8	4–7	—	8–3	5–6	6–1	9–2	3–9
8	Germany	11	5	6	57	68	−11	0.455	37	39	5	16	54%		4–3	2–6	3–7	6–8	9–4	4–9	3–8	—	7–6	5–9	8–4	6–4
9	Slovakia	11	4	7	62	72	−10	0.364	39	46	1	11	57%		5–7	5–9	2–9	6–7	5–7	5–6	6–5	6–7	—	8–3	7–6	7–6
10	Sweden	11	4	7	47	66	−19	0.364	29	45	8	8	57%		2–4	4–8	4–9	5–4	7–3	5–3	1–6	9–5	3–8	—	5–6	2–10
11	Finland	11	2	9	53	87	−34	0.182	35	46	1	11	51%		3–11	4–8	4–6	4–6	5–12	7–10	2–9	4–8	6–7	6–5	—	8–5
12	United States	11	2	9	58	63	−5	0.182	37	45	3	12	60%		3–7	5–6	4–6	4–5	4–6	4–7	9–3	4–6	6–7	10–2	5–8	—

Source: Paralympic.org

== Results ==
All times are local (UTC+9).

=== Draw 1 ===
Saturday, 10 March, 14:35

Sheet A	1	2	3	4	5	6	7	8	Final
Norway (Lorentsen)	1	0	0	0	0	1	0	0	2
Great Britain (Neilson)	0	1	0	2	0	0	1	1	5

Sheet B	1	2	3	4	5	6	7	8	Final
Switzerland (Wagner)	0	0	0	0	0	0	X	X	0
Canada (Ideson)	2	1	1	1	2	1	X	X	8

Sheet C	1	2	3	4	5	6	7	8	Final
United States (Black)	0	0	0	1	0	0	2	X	3
South Korea (Seo)	0	1	1	0	4	1	0	X	8

Sheet D	1	2	3	4	5	6	7	8	Final
Germany (Putzich)	0	2	0	1	0	0	3	3	9
Neutral Paralympic Athletes (Kurokhtin)	1	0	1	0	1	1	0	0	4

=== Draw 2 ===
Saturday, 10 March, 19:35

Sheet A	1	2	3	4	5	6	7	8	Final
Sweden (Petersson Dahl)	0	0	1	0	1	0	2	X	4
China (Wang)	1	3	0	1	0	4	0	X	9

Sheet B	1	2	3	4	5	6	7	8	EE	Final
South Korea (Seo)	1	0	1	0	2	0	0	1	1	6
Neutral Paralympic Athletes (Kurokhtin)	0	2	0	1	0	1	1	0	0	5

Sheet C	1	2	3	4	5	6	7	8	Final
Slovakia (Ďuriš)	1	0	0	2	0	3	1	0	7
Finland (S. Karjalainen)	0	1	1	0	1	0	0	3	6

Sheet D	1	2	3	4	5	6	7	8	Final
Canada (Ideson)	0	2	2	1	1	4	X	X	10
Norway (Lorentsen)	1	0	0	0	0	0	X	X	1

=== Draw 3 ===
Sunday, 11 March, 9:35

Sheet B	1	2	3	4	5	6	7	8	Final
United States (Black)	0	3	0	0	0	0	0	X	4
Germany (Putzich)	0	0	2	2	1	1	0	X	6

Sheet C	1	2	3	4	5	6	7	8	Final
Switzerland (Wagner)	0	0	3	0	1	2	0	1	7
Great Britain (Neilson)	1	1	0	1	0	0	1	0	4

=== Draw 4 ===
Sunday, 11 March, 14:35

Sheet A	1	2	3	4	5	6	7	8	Final
Neutral Paralympic Athletes (Kurokhtin)	3	0	0	0	1	3	5	X	12
Finland (S. Karjalainen)	0	1	2	2	0	0	0	X	5

Sheet B	1	2	3	4	5	6	7	8	Final
Norway (Lorentsen)	0	1	0	0	0	0	X	X	1
China (Wang)	2	0	2	2	2	2	X	X	10

Sheet C	1	2	3	4	5	6	7	8	Final
Canada (Ideson)	0	0	4	1	1	0	0	2	8
Sweden (Petersson Dahl)	1	3	0	0	0	0	0	0	4

Sheet D	1	2	3	4	5	6	7	8	Final
Slovakia (Ďuriš)	2	0	2	0	0	1	0	0	5
South Korea (Seo)	0	3	0	1	0	0	1	2	7

=== Draw 5 ===
Sunday, 11 March, 19:35

Sheet A	1	2	3	4	5	6	7	8	Final
Slovakia (Ďuriš)	0	1	1	1	1	0	1	0	5
Switzerland (Wagner)	3	0	0	0	0	1	0	2	6

Sheet B	1	2	3	4	5	6	7	8	Final
Great Britain (Neilson)	2	0	0	1	2	2	2	X	9
Finland (S. Karjalainen)	0	1	1	0	0	0	0	X	2

Sheet C	1	2	3	4	5	6	7	8	Final
China (Wang)	2	0	0	0	4	1	0	X	7
Germany (Putzich)	0	0	1	1	0	0	1	X	3

Sheet D	1	2	3	4	5	6	7	8	Final
United States (Black)	2	2	1	1	0	2	2	X	10
Sweden (Petersson Dahl)	0	0	0	0	2	0	0	X	2

=== Draw 6 ===
Monday, 12 March, 9:35

Sheet A	1	2	3	4	5	6	7	8	Final
South Korea (Seo)	3	0	0	1	0	3	0	X	7
Canada (Ideson)	0	0	1	0	2	0	2	X	5

Sheet B	1	2	3	4	5	6	7	8	Final
Sweden (Petersson Dahl)	0	1	0	0	2	0	0	X	3
Slovakia (Ďuriš)	3	0	2	1	0	1	1	X	8

Sheet C	1	2	3	4	5	6	7	8	Final
Norway (Stordahl)	1	1	0	1	1	2	0	X	6
Neutral Paralympic Athletes (Kurokhtin)	0	0	1	0	0	0	1	X	2

Sheet D	1	2	3	4	5	6	7	8	Final
Finland (S. Karjalainen)	0	0	1	0	2	0	1	X	4
China (Wang)	1	2	0	2	0	1	0	X	6

=== Draw 7 ===
Monday, 12 March, 14:35

Sheet A	1	2	3	4	5	6	7	8	Final
Germany (Putzich)	3	0	1	0	2	0	1	0	7
Slovakia (Ďuriš)	0	2	0	2	0	1	0	1	6

Sheet B	1	2	3	4	5	6	7	8	Final
China (Wang)	1	0	1	0	1	3	2	X	8
Switzerland (Wagner)	0	1	0	1	0	0	0	X	2

Sheet C	1	2	3	4	5	6	7	8	Final
Finland (S. Karjalainen)	0	0	4	0	1	0	1	2	8
United States (Black)	1	1	0	2	0	1	0	0	5

Sheet D	1	2	3	4	5	6	7	8	Final
Sweden (Petersson Dahl)	0	0	0	0	0	0	1	X	1
Great Britain (Neilson)	2	1	1	1	1	0	0	X	6

=== Draw 8 ===
Monday, 12 March, 19:35

Sheet A	1	2	3	4	5	6	7	8	Final
Switzerland (Wagner)	0	0	1	0	1	0	1	0	3
Norway (Stordahl)	1	1	0	2	0	1	0	1	6

Sheet B	1	2	3	4	5	6	7	8	Final
Neutral Paralympic Athletes (Kurokhtin)	1	1	1	1	1	0	0	1	6
United States (Black)	0	0	0	0	0	3	1	0	4

Sheet C	1	2	3	4	5	6	7	8	Final
Great Britain (Neilson)	0	1	1	1	2	0	3	X	8
Canada (Ideson)	0	0	0	0	0	1	0	X	1

Sheet D	1	2	3	4	5	6	7	8	Final
South Korea (Seo)	0	0	0	0	2	0	0	1	3
Germany (Putzich)	1	0	1	1	0	0	1	0	4

=== Draw 9 ===
Tuesday, 13 March, 9:35

Sheet A	1	2	3	4	5	6	7	8	Final
Finland (S. Karjalainen)	0	0	1	1	0	1	0	X	3
South Korea (Seo)	4	0	0	0	4	0	3	X	11

Sheet B	1	2	3	4	5	6	7	8	Final
Norway (Stordahl)	1	0	1	0	1	0	1	0	4
Sweden (Petersson Dahl)	0	3	0	1	0	1	0	0	5

Sheet C	1	2	3	4	5	6	7	8	Final
Neutral Paralympic Athletes (Kurokhtin)	1	1	0	2	3	0	0	X	7
Slovakia (Ďuriš)	0	0	2	0	0	2	1	X	5

Sheet D	1	2	3	4	5	6	7	8	Final
China (Wang)	1	1	0	3	0	0	0	X	5
Canada (Ideson)	0	0	1	0	2	4	1	X	8

=== Draw 10 ===
Tuesday, 13 March, 14:35

Sheet A	1	2	3	4	5	6	7	8	Final
United States (Black)	0	1	1	0	1	0	1	0	4
China (Wang)	1	0	0	1	0	2	0	2	6

Sheet B	1	2	3	4	5	6	7	8	Final
Great Britain (Neilson)	0	1	0	1	0	1	1	1	5
Slovakia (Ďuriš)	1	0	3	0	2	0	0	0	6

Sheet C	1	2	3	4	5	6	7	8	Final
Sweden (Petersson Dahl)	1	3	2	2	0	0	1	0	9
Germany (Putzich)	0	0	0	0	3	1	1	0	5

Sheet D	1	2	3	4	5	6	7	8	Final
Finland (S. Karjalainen)	0	0	3	0	1	2	1	0	7
Switzerland (Wagner)	3	2	0	3	0	0	0	2	10

=== Draw 11 ===
Tuesday, 13 March, 19:35

Sheet A	1	2	3	4	5	6	7	8	Final
Neutral Paralympic Athletes (Kurokhtin)	1	1	0	1	2	2	1	X	8
Great Britain (Neilson)	0	0	2	0	0	0	0	X	2

Sheet B	1	2	3	4	5	6	7	8	EE	Final
Canada (Ideson)	0	0	1	1	1	1	0	1	1	6
United States (Black)	2	1	0	0	0	0	2	0	0	5

Sheet C	1	2	3	4	5	6	7	8	Final
Switzerland (Wagner)	0	1	0	1	1	0	1	1	5
South Korea (Seo)	2	0	1	0	0	3	0	0	6

Sheet D	1	2	3	4	5	6	7	8	Final
Germany (Putzich)	2	0	2	2	0	0	0	0	6
Norway (Stordahl)	0	2	0	0	2	1	1	2	8

=== Draw 12 ===
Wednesday, 14 March, 9:35

Sheet A	1	2	3	4	5	6	7	8	Final
Finland (S. Karjalainen)	2	0	1	2	0	0	1	0	6
Sweden (Petersson Dahl)	0	1	0	0	2	1	0	1	5

Sheet B	1	2	3	4	5	6	7	8	Final
Germany (Putzich)	1	0	1	0	1	0	0	X	3
Great Britain (Neilson)	0	1	0	2	0	3	2	X	8

Sheet C	1	2	3	4	5	6	7	8	Final
Slovakia (Ďuriš)	0	1	0	0	1	0	0	X	2
China (Wang)	2	0	2	1	0	1	3	X	9

Sheet D	1	2	3	4	5	6	7	8	Final
Switzerland (Wagner)	0	2	1	0	1	0	1	2	7
United States (Black)	1	0	0	1	0	2	0	0	4

=== Draw 13 ===
Wednesday, 14 March, 14:35

Sheet A	1	2	3	4	5	6	7	8	Final
Great Britain (Neilson)	0	1	0	0	1	0	1	X	3
United States (Black)	1	0	3	2	0	3	0	X	9

Sheet B	1	2	3	4	5	6	7	8	Final
South Korea (Seo)	0	2	0	0	0	0	X	X	2
Norway (Lorentsen)	2	0	0	2	1	4	X	X	9

Sheet C	1	2	3	4	5	6	7	8	Final
Germany (Putzich)	0	1	0	0	3	0	X	X	4
Switzerland (Wagner)	1	0	4	2	0	2	X	X	9

Sheet D	1	2	3	4	5	6	7	8	Final
Canada (Ideson)	0	0	1	0	1	1	0	2	5
Neutral Paralympic Athletes (Kurokhtin)	1	0	0	1	0	0	2	0	4

=== Draw 14 ===
Wednesday, 14 March, 19:35

Sheet A	1	2	3	4	5	6	7	8	Final
China (Wang)	3	0	0	3	0	3	1	X	10
Neutral Paralympic Athletes (Kurokhtin)	0	1	2	0	1	0	0	X	4

Sheet B	1	2	3	4	5	6	7	8	Final
Slovakia (Ďuriš)	0	0	0	0	3	1	1	0	5
Canada (Ideson)	2	3	1	1	0	0	0	2	9

Sheet C	1	2	3	4	5	6	7	8	Final
South Korea (Seo)	1	1	0	1	0	0	1	X	4
Sweden (Petersson Dahl)	0	0	1	0	1	0	0	X	2

Sheet D	1	2	3	4	5	6	7	8	Final
Norway (Lorentsen)	2	2	0	1	0	1	0	X	6
Finland (S. Karjalainen)	0	0	1	0	1	0	2	X	4

=== Draw 15 ===
Thursday, 15 March, 9:35

Sheet A	1	2	3	4	5	6	7	8	Final
Canada (Ideson)	0	0	3	1	0	1	1	X	6
Germany (Putzich)	1	0	0	0	1	0	0	X	2

Sheet B	1	2	3	4	5	6	7	8	Final
Switzerland (Wagner)	0	0	1	2	0	0	1	0	4
Neutral Paralympic Athletes (Kurokhtin)	2	1	0	0	1	1	0	1	6

Sheet C	1	2	3	4	5	6	7	8	Final
United States (Black)	0	1	1	0	0	2	0	0	4
Norway (Lorentsen)	1	0	0	2	1	0	0	1	5

Sheet D	1	2	3	4	5	6	7	8	Final
Great Britain (Neilson)	1	0	0	2	1	0	0	0	4
South Korea (Seo)	0	2	0	0	0	1	1	1	5

=== Draw 16 ===
Thursday, 15 March, 14:35

Sheet A	1	2	3	4	5	6	7	8	EE	Final
Norway (Lorentsen)	1	0	1	0	1	0	1	2	1	7
Slovakia (Ďuriš)	0	2	0	3	0	1	0	0	0	6

Sheet B	1	2	3	4	5	6	7	8	Final
China (Wang)	0	1	0	4	0	0	1	0	6
South Korea (Seo)	2	0	1	0	1	2	0	1	7

Sheet C	1	2	3	4	5	6	7	8	Final
Canada (Ideson)	0	0	1	1	1	0	3	2	8
Finland (Karjalainen)	2	1	0	0	0	1	0	0	4

Sheet D	1	2	3	4	5	6	7	8	Final
Neutral Paralympic Athletes (Kurokhtin)	1	0	0	0	0	1	1	X	3
Sweden (Petersson Dahl)	0	0	2	3	2	0	0	X	7

=== Draw 17 ===
Thursday, 15 March, 19:35

Sheet A	1	2	3	4	5	6	7	8	Final
Sweden (Petersson Dahl)	0	1	0	0	0	1	0	3	5
Switzerland (Wagner)	0	0	1	0	1	0	1	0	3

Sheet B	1	2	3	4	5	6	7	8	Final
Finland (S. Karjalainen)	2	0	0	0	2	0	0	X	4
Germany (Putzich)	0	1	1	1	0	3	2	X	8

Sheet C	1	2	3	4	5	6	7	8	Final
China (Wang)	0	2	0	2	0	5	X	X	9
Great Britain (Neilson)	1	0	0	0	2	0	X	X	3

Sheet D	1	2	3	4	5	6	7	8	Final
United States (Black)	1	0	2	0	1	0	2	0	6
Slovakia (Ďuriš)	0	1	0	3	0	1	0	2	7

== Playoffs ==
Semifinals
1	South Korea	6
4	Norway	8
2	Canada	3
3	China	4

Gold medal game
4	Norway	5
3	China	6
Bronze medal game
1	South Korea	3
2	Canada	5

=== Semifinals ===
Friday, 16 March, 15:35

Sheet A	1	2	3	4	5	6	7	8	Final
China (Wang)	0	1	0	2	0	0	0	1	4
Canada (Ideson)	0	0	1	0	2	0	0	0	3

Sheet C	1	2	3	4	5	6	7	8	EE	Final
South Korea (Seo)	0	2	0	2	0	0	0	2	0	6
Norway (Lorentsen)	1	0	3	0	0	0	2	0	2	8

=== Bronze medal game ===
Saturday, 17 March, 9:35

Sheet B	1	2	3	4	5	6	7	8	Final
South Korea (Seo)	0	0	1	0	1	0	1	X	3
Canada (Ideson)	2	0	0	2	0	1	0	X	5

=== Gold medal game ===
Saturday, 17 March, 14:35

Sheet B	1	2	3	4	5	6	7	8	EE	Final
China (Wang)	2	0	0	1	0	0	2	0	1	6
Norway (Lorentsen)	0	1	2	0	0	1	0	1	0	5
