= 2019 Swiss Wheelchair Curling Championship =

- Host city: St. Gallen
- Dates: February 7–10
- Winner: Montana Tor
- Skip: Raymond Pfyffer
- Third: Philippe Bétrisey
- Second: Patrick Delacretaz
- Lead: Françoise Jacquerod
- Alternate: Hans Burgener
- Finalist: St. Gallen 1 (Claudia Hüttenmoser)

The 2019 Swiss Wheelchair Curling Championship was held from February 7 to 10, 2019 in St. Gallen.

== Teams ==
Team	Skip	Third	Second	Lead	Alternate	Coach
Bern	Daniel Meyer	Martin Bieri	Heinz Gertsch	Marianne Läderach	Adela Al-Roumi	
Genève	Olivier Joseph	Mina Carina Mojtahedi	Laurent Kneubühl	Olivier Godinat	Cedric Fillettaz	Michel Bise
Lausanne Olympique	Eric Décorvet	Didier Recordon	Léo Gottet	Mélanie Villars	Konstantin Schmaeh	Christian Gringet
Montana Tor	Raymond Pfyffer	Philippe Bétrisey	Patrick Delacretaz	Françoise Jaquerod	Hans Burgener	
Rollstuhlclub beider Basel	Günther Truog	Martin Vögtli	Beatrix Blauel	Christian Burkhalter	Eva Burgunder, Heinz Meier	Mark Steffen
St. Gallen 1	Claudia Hüttenmoser	Claudia Baumgartner	Hanspeter Bieri	Daniel Baumann		Manuela Haas, René Rohr
St. Gallen 2	Ivo Hasler	Ewald Bannwart	Christine Betschart	Brigitte Huber	Heinz Bänziger	Jannis Bannwart, René Rohr
Wetzikon	Marcel Bodenmann	Harry Pavel	Werner Locher	Marlise Schwitter	Vroni Forrer, Daniel Schühle	Peter Nater, Lorna Rettig

== Round-robin results and standings ==
	Team (Skip)	A1	A2	A3	A4	A5	A6	A7	A8	W	L	Place
A1	Bern (Daniel Meyer)	*	12:1	4:9	3:6	6:7	5:6	4:10	9:11	1	6	7
A2	Genève (Olivier Joseph)	1:12	*	0:13	0:15	4:9	3:12	1:8	3:12	0	7	8
A3	Lausanne Olympique (Eric Décorvet)	9:4	13:0	*	7:8	5:4	3:5	8:2	10:6	5	2	3
A4	Montana Tor (Raymond Pfyffer)	6:3	15:0	8:7	*	6:9	3:5	12:4	10:2	5	2	2
A5	Rollstuhlclub beider Basel (Günther Truog)	7:6	9:4	4:5	9:6	*	5:9	11:4	3:6	4	3	5
A6	St. Gallen 1 (Claudia Hüttenmoser)	6:5	12:3	5:3	5:3	9:5	*	7:3	4:10	6	1	1
A7	St. Gallen 2 (Ivo Hasler)	10:4	8:1	2:8	4:12	4:11	3:7	*	6:5	3	4	6
A8	Wetzikon (Marcel Bodenmann)	11:9	12:3	6:10	2:10	6:3	10:4	5:6	*	4	3	4

== Playoffs ==
Sunday, February 10, 13:30

=== Classification for 7th place ===
Sheet E	1	2	3	4	5	6	7	8	Final
Bern (Daniel Meyer)	0	1	1	1	1	0	0	0	4
Genève (Olivier Joseph)	3	0	0	0	0	2	1	3	9

=== Classification for 5th place ===
Sheet D	1	2	3	4	5	6	7	8	Final
Rollstuhlclub beider Basel (Günther Truog)	2	1	0	1	1	1	2	X	8
St. Gallen 2 (Ivo Hasler)	0	0	2	0	0	0	0	X	2

=== Bronze medal game ===
Sheet C	1	2	3	4	5	6	7	8	Final
Wetzikon (Marcel Bodenmann)	0	0	0	0	0	2	X	X	2
Lausanne Olympique (Eric Décorvet)	1	3	1	1	4	0	X	X	10

=== Final ===
Sheet B	1	2	3	4	5	6	7	8	Final
St. Gallen 1 (Claudia Hüttenmoser)	2	0	1	0	0	1	0	0	4
Montana Tor (Raymond Pfyffer)	0	1	0	1	2	0	1	1	6

== Final standings ==
Place	Team	Skip	Games	Wins	Losses
1st place, gold medalist(s)	Montana Tor	Raymond Pfyffer	8	6	2
2nd place, silver medalist(s)	St. Gallen 1	Claudia Hüttenmoser	8	6	2
3rd place, bronze medalist(s)	Lausanne Olympique	Eric Décorvet	8	6	2
4	Wetzikon	Marcel Bodenmann	8	4	4
5	Rollstuhlclub beider Basel	Günther Truog	8	5	3
6	St. Gallen 2	Ivo Hasler	8	3	5
7	Genève	Olivier Joseph	8	1	7
8	Bern	Daniel Meyer	8	1	7
