= Gary Logan =

Scottish wheelchair curler

- Curler ♂
- Born: 1 April 1971 (age 55)

Curling career
- Member Association: Scotland
- World Wheelchair Championship: 2 (2019, 2024)
Medal record
Wheelchair curling
World Wheelchair Championship
Silver medal – second place	2019 Sterling

Gary Logan (born 1 April 1971) is a Scottish wheelchair curler.

== Teams ==
Season	Skip	Third	Second	Lead	Alternate	Coach	Events
2016–17	Stewart Pimblett	Gary Logan	David Melrose	Christine Warwick			SWhCC 2017 (7th)
2018–19	Aileen Neilson	Hugh Nibloe	Robert McPherson	David Melrose	Gary Logan	Sheila Swan	WWhCC 2019 (silver)
