= Hans Burgener =

Swiss wheelchair curler and Paralympian

- Curler
- Born: 25 April 1964 (age 62); Grindelwald, Switzerland

Curling career
- Member Association: Switzerland
- World Wheelchair Championship: 3 (2017, 2019, 2020)
- Paralympic: 2 (2018, 2022)
Medal record
Wheelchair curling
Swiss Wheelchair Curling Championship
Gold medal – first place	2014 Wetzikon
Gold medal – first place	2019 St. Gallen
Gold medal – first place	2020 Brig
Gold medal – first place	2022 Geneva
Gold medal – first place	2023 St. Gallen
Gold medal – first place	2024 Bern
Gold medal – first place	2026 Bern
Silver medal – second place	2025 Bern

Hans Burgener (born 25 April 1964) is a Swiss wheelchair curler.

== Career ==
He participated in the 2018 Winter Paralympics where Swiss team finished on sixth place.

At the national level, he is a seven-time Swiss wheelchair curling champion (2014, 2019, 2020, 2022, 2023, 2024, 2026).

== Teams ==
Season	Skip	Third	Second	Lead	Alternate	Coach	Events
2016–17	Felix Wagner	Marcel Bodenmann	Claudia Hüttenmoser	Beatrix Blaül	Hans Burgener	Stephan Pfister	WWhCC 2017 (8th)
2017–18	Anton Kehrli	Hans Burgener	Susanne von Gunten	Beatrix Blaül	Hans Burgener	Stephan Pfister	SWhCC 2018 (5th)
2017–18	Felix Wagner	Claudia Hüttenmoser	Marcel Bodenmann	Beatrix Blaül	Hans Burgener	Stephan Pfister	WPG 2018 (6th)
2018–19	Raymond Pfyffer	Philippe Bétrisey	Patrick Delacretaz	Françoise Jaquerod	Hans Burgener		SWhCC 2019 (gold)
2018–19	Raymond Pfyffer	Hans Burgener	Eric Decorvet	Françoise Jaquerod	Adelah Al Roumi	Stephan Pfister, Anne Gabriele Mittaz	WWhCC 2019 (5th)
2019–20	Raymond Pfyffer	Hans Burgener	Françoise Jaquerod	Bernard Moriset	Patrick Delacretaz		SWhCC 2020 (gold)
2019–20	Raymond Pfyffer	Hans Burgener	Françoise Jaquerod	Eric Decorvet	Adelah Al Roumi	Stephan Pfister, Lukas Haggenmacher	WWhCC 2020 (11th)
