= Eirik Bye =

Norwegian Paralympic cross-country skier

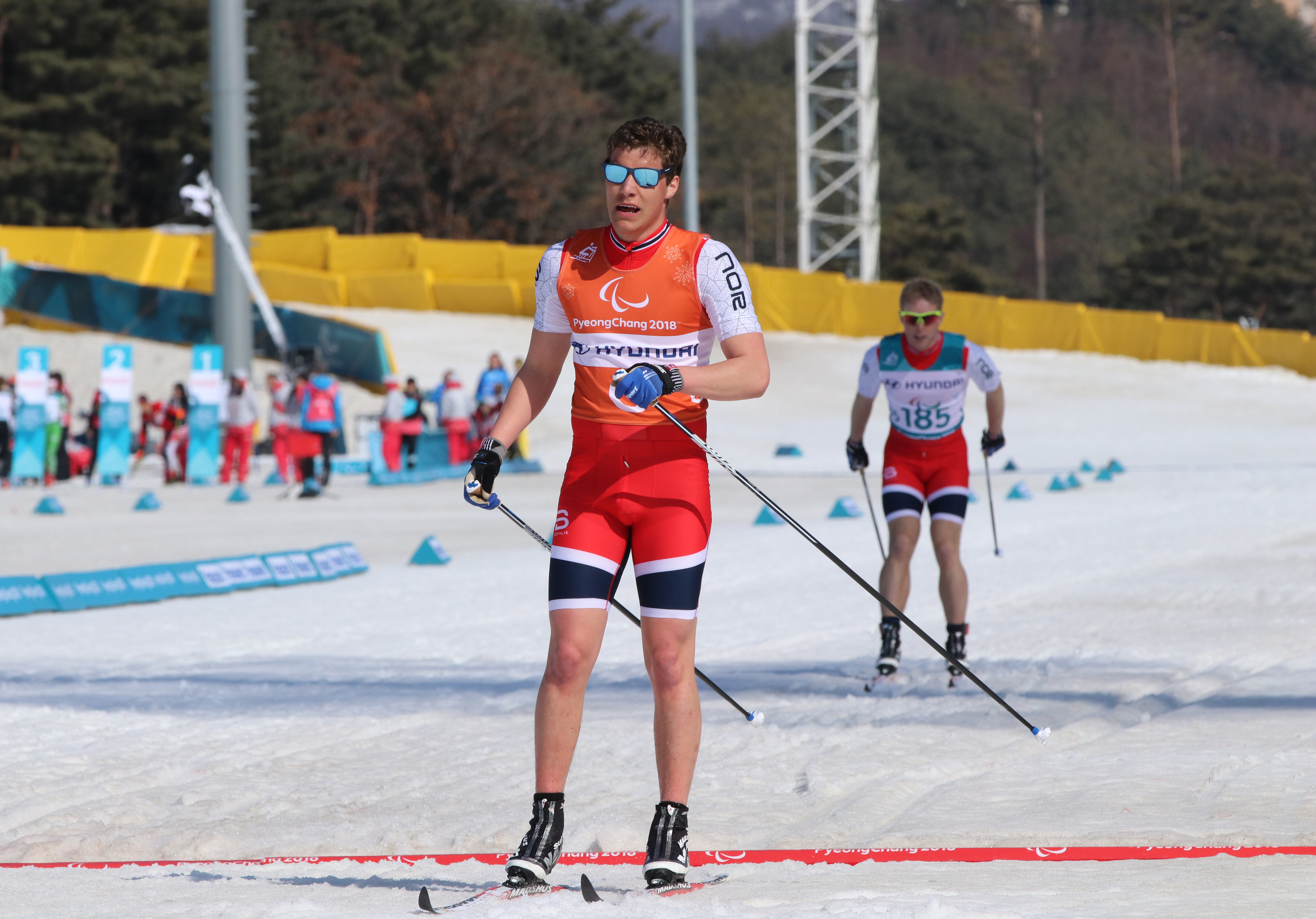
- Born: 19 September 1995 (age 29); Tårnåsen, Norway
- Education: Inland Norway University of Applied Sciences, Lillehammer
- Height: 1.74 m (5 ft 9 in)

Eirik Bye (born 19 September 1995) is a visually impaired Paralympic Nordic skier who won medals for Norway at the 2018 Winter Paralympics. His guide was Arvid Nelson.
