= Daniel Meyer (curler) =

Swiss wheelchair curler and Paralympian

- Curler ♂
- Born: 6 June 1955 (age 71)

Curling career
- Member Association: Switzerland
- World Wheelchair Championship: 1 (2009)
- Paralympic: 1 (2010)
Medal record
Wheelchair curling

Daniel Meyer (born 6 June 1955) is a Swiss wheelchair curler.

He participated in the 2010 Winter Paralympics where Swiss team finished on seventh place.

== Teams ==
Season	Skip	Third	Second	Lead	Alternate	Coach	Events
2008–09	Manfred Bolliger	Martin Bieri	Daniel Meyer	Anton Kehrli	Melanie Villars	Anton Ruesser, Nadia Röthlisberger-Raspe	WWhCC 2009 (10th)
2009–10	Manfred Bolliger	Claudia Hüttenmoser	Daniel Meyer	Anton Kehrli	Martin Bieri	Nadia Röthlisberger-Raspe	WPG 2010 (7th)
2010–11	Manfred Bolliger	Claudia Hüttenmoser	Hieronymus Liechtenhan	Daniel Meyer	Martin Bieri	Stephan Pfister	WWhCQ 2010 (5th)
2018–19	Daniel Meyer	Martin Bieri	Heinz Gertsch	Marianne Läderach	Adela Al-Roumi		SWhCC 2019 (8th)
