= Seo Soon-seok =

South Korean wheelchair curler

- Curler ♂
- Born: May 12, 1971 (age 55); Osan

Team
- Curling club: Uijeongbu Rolling Stone

Curling career
- Member Association: South Korea
- World Wheelchair Championship: 3 (2016, 2017, 2019)
- Paralympic: 2 (2014, 2018)
Medal record
Wheelchair curling
World Wheelchair Championship
Bronze medal – third place	2016 Lucerne
Bronze medal – third place	2019 Stirling

Seo Soon-seok(Korean: 서순석; born May 12, 1971 in Osan) is a South Korean wheelchair curler.

He participated at the 2014 and 2018 Winter Paralympics where South Korean team finished on ninth and fourth places respectively.

== Wheelchair curling teams and events ==
Season	Skip	Third	Second	Lead	Alternate	Coach	Events
2013–14	Kim Myung-jin	Kim Jong-pan	Seo Soon-seok	Kang Mi-suk	Yun Hee-keong	Ahn Jae-sung	WPG 2014 (9th)
2014–15	Kim Jong-pan	Seo Soon-seok	Jung Seung-won	Yun Hee-kyeong	Yang Hui-tae	Shin Kyung-yong	WWhCQ 2014 (4th)
2015–16	Yang Hui-tae	Cha Jae-goan	Seo Soon-seok	Bang Min-ja	Jung Seung-won	Beak Jong-chul	WWhBCC 2015 (silver)
2015–16	Yang Hui-tae	Jung Seung-won	Seo Soon-seok	Bang Min-ja	Cha Jae-goan	Beak Jong-chul	WWhCC 2016 (bronze)
2016–17	Kim Jong-pan	Seo Soon-seok	Cha Jae-goan	Cho Min-kyong	Lee Dong-ha	Beak Jong-chul	WWhCC 2017 (6th)
2017–18	Cha Jae-goan (fourth)	Jung Seung-won	Seo Soon-seok (skip)	Bang Min-ja	Lee Dong-ha	Beak Jong-chul, Hwang Hyeon-jun	WPG 2018 (4th)
2018–19	Yang Hui-tae (fourth)	Seo Soon-seok	Cha Jin-ho (skip)	Bang Min-ja	Min Byeong-seok	Beak Jong-chul, Kim Seok-hyun	WWhCC 2019 (bronze)
