= Cha Jae-goan =

South Korean wheelchair curler (born 1972)

- Curler ♂
- Born: February 22, 1972 (age 54)

Curling career
- Member Association: South Korea
- World Wheelchair Championship: 2 (2016, 2017)
- Paralympic: 1 (2018)
Medal record
Wheelchair curling
World Wheelchair Championship
Bronze medal – third place	2016 Lucerne

Cha Jae-goan (Note: Other writings: Jae-goan Cha, Cha Jaegoan, Jaegoan Cha, Cha Jae Goan, Jae Goan Cha.) (Korean: 차재관; born February 22, 1972) is a South Korean wheelchair curler.

He participated at the 2018 Winter Paralympics where South Korean team finished on fourth place.

== Wheelchair curling teams and events ==
Season	Skip	Third	Second	Lead	Alternate	Coach	Events
2015–16	Yang Hui-tae	Cha Jae-goan	Seo Soon-seok	Bang Min-ja	Jung Seung-won	Beak Jong-chul	WWhBCC 2015 (silver)
2015–16	Yang Hui-tae	Jung Seung-won	Seo Soon-seok	Bang Min-ja	Cha Jae-goan	Beak Jong-chul	WWhCC 2016 (bronze)
2016–17	Kim Jong-pan	Seo Soon-seok	Cha Jae-goan	Cho Min-kyong	Lee Dong-ha	Beak Jong-chul	WWhCC 2017 (6th)
2017–18	Cha Jae-goan (fourth)	Jung Seung-won	Seo Soon-seok (skip)	Bang Min-ja	Lee Dong-ha	Beak Jong-chul, Hwang Hyeon-jun	WPG 2018 (4th)
