= Bang Min-ja =

South Korean wheelchair curler

- Curler ♀
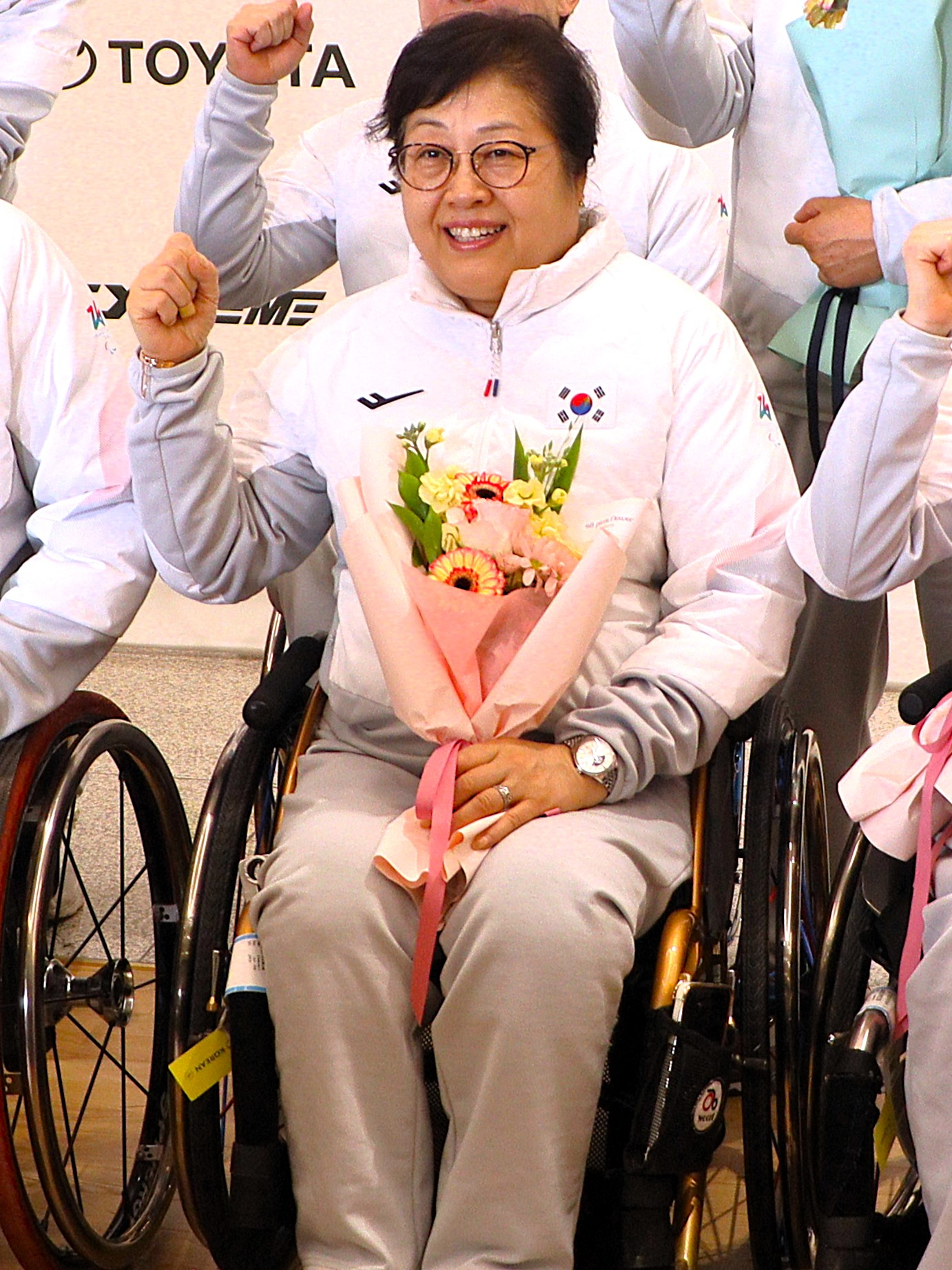
- Born: March 15, 1962 (age 64); Jangseong-gun, South Jeolla Province, South Korea

Curling career
- Member Association: South Korea
- World Wheelchair Championship: 5 (2012, 2013, 2016, 2019, 2020)
- Paralympic: 2 (2018, 2026)
Medal record
Wheelchair curling
World Wheelchair Championship
Silver medal – second place	2012 Chuncheon City
Bronze medal – third place	2016 Lucerne
Bronze medal – third place	2019 Stirling

Bang Min-ja(Korean: 방민자; born March 15, 1962) is a South Korean wheelchair curler.

She participated at the 2018 Winter Paralympics where South Korean team finished on fourth place.

== Wheelchair curling teams and events ==
Season	Skip	Third	Second	Lead	Alternate	Coach	Events
2011–12	Kim Hak-sung	Jung Seung-won	Noh Byeong-il	Kang Mi-suk	Bang Min-ja	Park Kwon-il	WWhCC 2012 (silver)
2012–13	Kim Hak-sung	Jung Seung-won	Noh Byeong-il	Kang Mi-suk	Bang Min-ja	Park Kwon-il	WWhCC 2013 (9th)
2015–16	Yang Hui-tae	Cha Jae-goan	Seo Soon-seok	Bang Min-ja	Jung Seung-won	Beak Jong-chul	WWhBCC 2015 (silver)
2015–16	Yang Hui-tae	Jung Seung-won	Seo Soon-seok	Bang Min-ja	Cha Jae-goan	Beak Jong-chul	WWhCC 2016 (bronze)
2017–18	Cha Jae-goan (fourth)	Jung Seung-won	Seo Soon-seok (skip)	Bang Min-ja	Lee Dong-ha	Beak Jong-chul, Hwang Hyeon-jun	WPG 2018 (4th)
2018–19	Yang Hui-tae (fourth)	Seo Soon-seok	Cha Jin-ho (skip)	Bang Min-ja	Min Byeong-seok	Beak Jong-chul, Kim Seok-hyun	WWhCC 2019 (bronze)
2019–20	Yang Hui-tae (fourth)	Jung Seung-won (skip)	Park Kil-woo	Bang Min-ja	Min Byeong-seok	Kim Joung-yil, Yoon So-min	WWhCC 2020 (6th)
