= Kenny More =

Scottish male curler and coach

- Curler ♂
- Born: 30 December 1966 (age 59)

Curling career
- Member Association: Scotland, United Kingdom
Medal record
Curling

Kenny More (born 30 December 1966) is a Scottish curler and curling coach.

As a coach of British wheelchair curling team he participated in 2018 Winter Paralympics.

== Record as a coach of national teams ==
Year	Tournament, event	National team	Place
2018	2018 Winter Paralympics	United Kingdom (wheelchair)	7
