= Felix Wagner =

Swiss wheelchair curler and Paralympian

- Curler ♂
- Born: 21 October 1965 (age 61)

Curling career
- Member Association: Switzerland
- World Wheelchair Championship: 2 (2016, 2017)
- Paralympic: 1 (2018)
Medal record
Wheelchair curling

Felix Wagner (born 21 October 1965) is a Swiss wheelchair curler.

He participated in the 2018 Winter Paralympics where Swiss team finished on sixth place.

== Teams ==
Season	Skip	Third	Second	Lead	Alternate	Coach	Events
2011–12	Manfred Bolliger	Felix Wagner	Claudia Hüttenmoser	Eric Decorvet	Melanie Villars	Stephan Pfister	WWhCQ 2011 (5th)
2012–13	Felix Wagner	Claudia Hüttenmoser	Eric Decorvet	Anton Kehrli	Mireille Gauthey	Stephan Pfister	WWhCQ 2012 (7th)
2014–15	Felix Wagner	Eric Decorvet	Claudia Hüttenmoser	Ivo Hasler	Mireille Gauthey	Stephan Pfister	WWhCQ 2014 (7th)
2015–16	Felix Wagner	Eric Decorvet	Claudia Hüttenmoser	Beatrix Blaül	Marcel Bodenmann	Stephan Pfister	WWhCC 2016 (4th)
2016–17	Felix Wagner	Marcel Bodenmann	Claudia Hüttenmoser	Beatrix Blaül	Hans Burgener	Stephan Pfister	WWhCC 2017 (8th)
2017–18	Felix Wagner	Claudia Hüttenmoser	Marcel Bodenmann	Beatrix Blaül	Hans Burgener	Stephan Pfister	WPG 2018 (6th)
2019–20	Felix Wagner	Marcel Bodenmann	Marlise Schwitter	Daniel Schuehle			
