= Rusty Schieber =

American male curler and coach

- Curler ♂
- Born: October 6, 1962 (age 64); Ripon, Wisconsin, U.S.

Curling career
- Member Association: United States
Medal record
Curling

Russell Schieber (born October 6, 1962 in Ripon, Wisconsin) is an American curler and curling coach.

As a coach of American wheelchair curling team he participated in 2018 Winter Paralympics and 2022 Winter Paralympics.

He is National Wheelchair Coach of USA Curling Association.

== Record as a coach of national teams ==
Year	Tournament, event	National team	Place
2018	2018 Winter Paralympics	United States (wheelchair)	12
2019	2019 World Wheelchair Curling Championship	United States (wheelchair)	11
2019	2019 World Wheelchair-B Curling Championship	United States (wheelchair)	11
2020	2020 World Wheelchair-B Curling Championship	United States (wheelchair)	1st place, gold medalist(s)
2021	2021 World Wheelchair Curling Championship	United States (wheelchair)	4
2022	2022 Winter Paralympics	United States (wheelchair)	5
