= Tony Colacchio =

American curler and coach

- Curler ♂
- Born: April 6, 1945; Nashua, New Hampshire, U.S.
- Died: November 7, 2018 (aged 73); North Falmouth, Massachusetts, U.S.

Curling career
- Member Association: United States
Medal record
Curling

Anthony D. Colacchio (April 6, 1945 – November 7, 2018) was an American curler and curling coach.

As a coach of American wheelchair curling team he participated in 2018 Winter Paralympics.

Anthony Colacchio had many hobbies including golf, fishing, kayaking, carpentry and landscape work. He joined the Cape Cod Curling Club in 2000 and served as President from 2004 until 2006. He was instrumental in managing the club's building expansion, and he developed the Wheelchair Curling at the club level. For the past ten years he continued to develop and promote Wheelchair Curling, regionally, nationally and internationally. Tony achieved National Coaching Status and a Congressional Record of Honor in 2017 for his work in the field.

He died on November 7, 2018, from cancer.

== Record as a coach of national teams ==
Year	Tournament, event	National team	Place
2018	2018 Winter Paralympics	United States (wheelchair)	12
