= Meggan Dawson-Farrell =

Scottish wheelchair racer and curler

Personal information
- Born: 18 September 1992 (age 33)

Sport
- Disability class: T54
- Rank: 12th
- Event: 1500m
- Club: Red Star
- Coached by: Ian Mirfin

Meggan Dawson-Farrell (born 18 September 1992) is a Scottish wheelchair racer.

== Early life ==
Dawson-Farrell was born with spina bifida. She also had the condition hydrocephalus. She was unable to take part in sport at school but began after attending a youth sports camp at the age of fourteen.

== Career ==
Dawson-Farrell is classified as a T54 wheelchair athlete. She trains with coach Ian Mirfin at the Red Star Athletics Club, a club dedicated to disabled athletes. She was a torch bearer for the 2012 Summer Paralympics, and also took part in the 2014 Queen's Baton Relay preceding the Glasgow Commonwealth Games.

She holds the Scottish T54 record over all distances from 400m to the marathon, and is ranked 12th in the world in 1500m in her classification. She competed for Scotland at the 2014 Commonwealth Games in the T54 1500m, where she placed seventh.

At the IWAS World Junior Games held in August 2014 at Stoke Mandeville, Dawson-Farrell won the gold medal in the T54 100m event.

In 2017, she switched sports to compete in wheelchair curling. In April 2025 Dawson-Farrell was issued with a 14-month ban backdated to July 2025 for an anti-doping rule violation for unintentional use of salbutamol.
