= Stephan Pfister =

Swedish curler and coach

- Curler ♂
- Born: 8 August 1956 (age 70)

Curling career
- Member Association: South Korea
Medal record
Curling

Stephan Pfister (born 8 August 1956) is a Swiss male curler and curling coach.

As a coach of the Swiss wheelchair curling team, he participated in the 2018 Winter Paralympics and 2022 Winter Paralympics.

== Record as a coach of national teams ==
Year	Tournament, event	National team	Place
2010	2010 World Wheelchair Curling Qualification	Switzerland (wheelchair)	5
2011	2011 World Wheelchair Curling Qualification	Switzerland (wheelchair)	5
2012	2012 World Wheelchair Curling Qualification	Switzerland (wheelchair)	7
2014	2014 World Wheelchair Curling Qualification	Switzerland (wheelchair)	7
2016	2016 World Wheelchair Curling Championship	Switzerland (wheelchair)	4
2017	2017 World Wheelchair Curling Championship	Switzerland (wheelchair)	8
2018	2018 Winter Paralympics	Switzerland (wheelchair)	6
2019	2019 World Wheelchair Curling Championship	Switzerland (wheelchair)	5
2020	2020 World Wheelchair Curling Championship	Switzerland (wheelchair)	11
2021	2020 World Wheelchair-B Curling Championship	Switzerland (wheelchair)	2nd place, silver medalist(s)
2021	2021 World Wheelchair Curling Championship	Switzerland (wheelchair)	12
2022	2022 Winter Paralympics	Switzerland (wheelchair)	11
2022	2022 World Wheelchair Mixed Doubles Curling Championship	Switzerland (wheelchair mixed double)	11
2022	2022 World Wheelchair-B Curling Championship	Switzerland (wheelchair)	6
2023	2023 World Wheelchair Mixed Doubles Curling Championship	Switzerland (wheelchair mixed double)	16
