= Special Olympics Kosovo =

- Sport: Special Olympics
- Jurisdiction: Kosovo
- Founded: 2002
- Headquarters: Pristina
- CEO: Drita Dushi

Official website
- specialolympics-ks.org
- (Kosovo)

Special Olympics Kosovo is a sporting organisation for children and adults with intellectual disabilities that operates in Kosovo. It is part of the global Special Olympics movement.

== History ==
Special Olympics Kosovo was founded in 2002. Athletes from Kosovo first took part in the 2003 Special Olympics World Summer Games held in Dublin. This was the first time a team represented Kosovo at an international multisport event. Kosovo has participated in every Special Olympics World Summer Games since 2003 and Special Olympics World Winter Games since 2013.

== Official sports ==
Special Olympics Kosovo offers programs in the following sports:

=== Summer ===
- Athletics
- Basketball
- Bocce
- Boccia
- Rhythmic Gymnastics

=== Winter ===
- Alpine Skiing

== Kosovo at the Special Olympics World Games ==
Athletes representing Kosovo have participated in the Special Olympics World Games since 2003. Kosovo most recently participated in Berlin 2023.

Their most successful participation came at the 2019 Special Olympics in Abu Dhabi where the Kosovan delegation won three medals. Sheqir Vllasaliu won gold in athletics at the 200m run. While the other two remaining bronze medals were won by athlete Ibish Zogaj.

So far Kosovo won three medals, one of which is Gold and two of them being Bronze. All medals were won by male athletes, in the sport of Athletics.

=== Summer ===
Games	Athletes
(Republic of Ireland) Dublin 2003	4
(China) Shanghai 2007	4
(Greece) Athens 2011	4
(United States) Los Angeles 2015	2
(United Arab Emirates) Abu Dhabi 2019	4
(Germany) Berlin 2023	4

=== Winter ===
Games	Athletes
(South Korea) Pyongchang 2013	2
(Austria) Graz and Schladming 2017	2
(Russia) Kazan 2022	Cancelled
(Italy) Turin 2025	2

== See also ==
- Sport in Kosovo
- Membership of Kosovo in international sports federations
