= Special Olympics =

Governing body of Olympics for intellectually disabled athletes

- Founded: July 20, 1968; 58 years ago
- Founder: Eunice Kennedy Shriver
- Location: 2600 Virginia Ave., NW Washington, D.C., U.S. 20037
- Origins: Camp Shriver
- Region served: International
- Official language: English and the host country's official language when necessary
- Key people: Timothy Shriver (chairman of the board); David S Evangelista (president and CEO); William P. Alford (lead director & vice chair); Angelo Moratti (vice chair); Loretta Claiborne (vice chair)
- Website: www.specialolympics.org

Special Olympics is the world's largest sports organization for children and adults with intellectual disabilities, providing year-round training and activities to 5 million participants and Unified Sports partners in 172 countries and territories. Special Olympics events are held daily, in all levels including local, national, regional and global competitions, adding up to more than 100,000 events a year. Like the International Paralympic Committee, the Special Olympics organization is recognized by the International Olympic Committee; however, unlike the Paralympic Games, its World Games are not held in the same year nor in conjunction with the Olympic Games.

The Special Olympics World Games is a major event put on by the Special Olympics committee. The World Games generally alternate between summer and winter games, in two-year cycles, recurring every fourth year. The games were first held on July 20, 1968, in Chicago, Illinois, United States, with about 1,000 athletes from the U.S. and Canada. At those first games, honorary event chair Eunice Kennedy Shriver announced the formation of the Special Olympics organization. International participation expanded in subsequent games. In 2003, the first summer games held outside the United States were in Dublin, Ireland, with 7000 athletes from 150 countries. The most recent Summer Games were hosted in Berlin, Germany, from June 16 to 25, 2023.

The first World Winter Games were held in 1977 in Steamboat Springs, Colorado, U.S. Austria hosted the first Winter Games outside the United States in 1993. The most recent Special Olympics World Winter Games were held in Turino, Italy, from March 8, 2025, to March 15, 2025. During the World Winter Games of 2013 in Pyeongchang, South Korea, the first Special Olympics Global Development Summit was held on "Ending the Cycle of Poverty and Exclusion for People with Intellectual Disabilities", gathering government officials, activists and business leaders from around the world.

== History ==
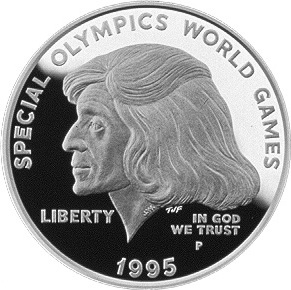
Eunice Kennedy Shriver is featured on the 1995 Special Olympics World Games silver dollar.

Eunice Kennedy Shriver, sister of U.S. president John F. Kennedy, believed that people with intellectual disabilities could be happy and live meaningful lives. Eunice founded the Special Olympics to positively change attitudes towards mentally handicapped people. In June 1963, Kennedy Shriver started a day camp called Camp Shriver for children with intellectual and physical disabilities at her home in Potomac, Maryland. The camp sought to address the concern that disabled children had very little opportunity to participate in organised athletic events. With Camp Shriver as an example, Kennedy Shriver, then head of the Joseph P. Kennedy Jr. Foundation and a member of President John F. Kennedy's Panel on Mental Retardation, promoted the concept of involvement in physical activity and other opportunities for people with intellectual disabilities. Camp Shriver became an annual event, and the Kennedy Foundation gave grants to universities, recreation departments, and community centers to hold similar camps.

Also in the early 1960s, Kennedy Shriver wrote an article in the Saturday Evening Post, stating that her sister Rosemary Kennedy, also President John F. Kennedy's sister, was born with intellectual disabilities. Rosemary was slow to learn, suffered seizures and mood swings. Her mother was told by doctors that Rosemary's situation was hopeless. In the early 1940s, Rosemary was prescribed a lobotomy, which left her incapacitated. This frank article about the President's family was seen as a "watershed" in changing public attitudes toward people with intellectual disabilities. Rosemary's disability provided Kennedy Shriver with an overall vision that people with intellectual disabilities could compete and at the same time unify together in public. It has often been said that Rosemary's disability was Eunice's inspiration to form Special Olympics (as the movement came to be called); Eunice told The New York Times in 1995 that that was not exactly the case. "The games should not focus on one individual," she said.

In 1958, Dr. James N. Oliver of England had conducted pioneering research, including a ground-breaking study showing that physical exercise and activities for children with intellectual disabilities had positive effects that also carried over into the classroom ("The Effects of Physical Conditioning Exercises and Activities on the Mental Characteristics of Educationally Sub-Normal Boys, British Journal of Educational Psychology, XXVIII, June 1958). Oliver in 1964 served as a consultant to Camp Shriver.

Let me win but if I cannot win, let me be brave in the attempt

— Special Olympics athlete oath

The 1964 research of Dr. Frank Hayden, a Canadian physical education professor from London, Ontario, demonstrated that intellectually disabled people can and should participate in physical exercise. He believed that the benefits of such activity would be seen in all areas of the athletes' lives. With the help of a local school that offered space in its gym, Hayden started one of the first public organised sports programs, floor hockey for individuals with intellectual disabilities, in the fall of 1968. In the mid-1960s, Hayden also developed an idea for national games, and his work brought him to the attention of the Kennedy Foundation. He shared his ideas for national games, while taking a teaching sabbatical and working for the foundation.

The first Special Olympics games were held on July 20, 1968, at Soldier Field in Chicago, six weeks after the assassination of Kennedy Shriver's younger brother Robert F. Kennedy. About 1,000 athletes from the U.S. and Canada took part in the one-day event, which was a joint venture by the Kennedy Foundation and the Chicago Park District. Anne McGlone Burke, then a physical education teacher with the Chicago Park District, began with the idea for a one-time, city-wide, Olympic-style athletic competition for people with special needs. Burke approached the Kennedy Foundation in 1967 to help fund the event. Kennedy Shriver, in turn, encouraged her to expand the idea beyond the city, and the foundation provided a grant of $25,000. When Burke had approached another charity for funding, she was told, "You should be ashamed of yourself putting these kinds of kids on display". The advisory committee to the Chicago Special Olympics included Dr. William Freeberg from Southern Illinois University, Dr. Hayden of the Kennedy Foundation, Dr. Arthur Peavy, Burke, William McFetridge, and Stephen Kelly of the Chicago Park District, as well as, Olympic decathlon champion Rafer Johnson. Kennedy Shriver was honorary chair. At the July 1968 games, Kennedy Shriver announced the formation of Special Olympics and that more games would be held every two years as a "Biennial International Special Olympics". Hayden served as the games executive director through 1972, and then in international development for the games. Some 2,500 participants were engaged in the 1970 games again held at Soldier Field. France sent the first athletes from outside North America to the second games held in 1970. The third games in 1972 saw 10 nations send athletes

In 1971, The U.S. Olympic Committee gave the Special Olympics official approval to use the name "Olympics". The first Special Olympics World Winter Games were held in February 1977 in Steamboat Springs, Colorado, U.S. The United Nations declared 1986, the year of the Special Olympics. In 1988, the Special Olympics was officially recognized by the International Olympic Committee (IOC). The first World Games held outside the U.S., were the winter games of 1993 in Salzburg and Schladming, Austria. The Austrian president was the first head of state to personally open the games.

In 1997, Healthy Athletes became an official Special Olympics initiative, offering health information and screenings to Special Olympics athletes worldwide. By 2010, the Healthy Athletes program had given free health screenings and treatment to more than 1 million people with intellectual disabilities.

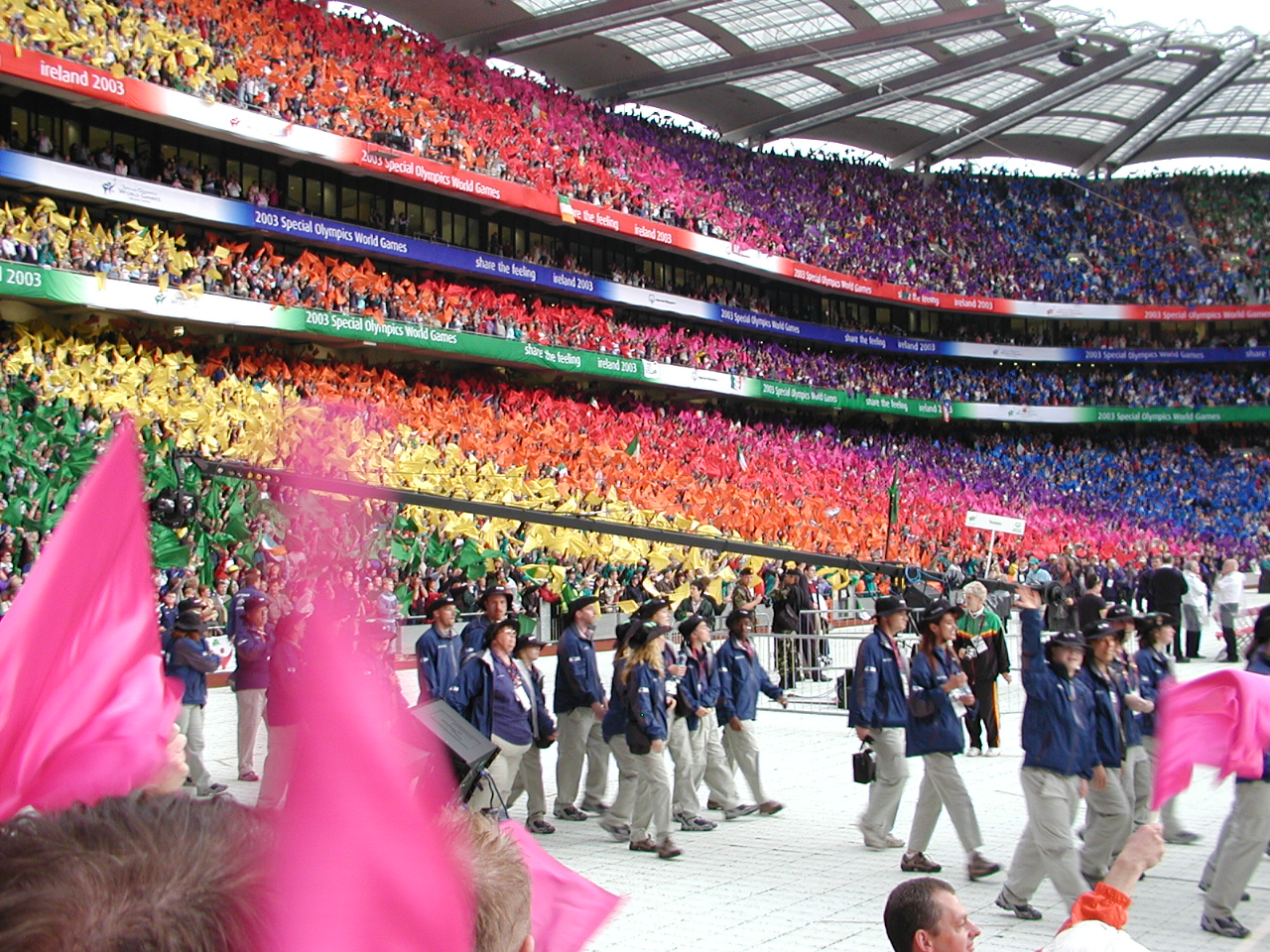
The crowd at the 2003 Special Olympics World Summer Games Opening Ceremonies in Croke Park, Dublin, Ireland

The 2003 Special Olympics World Summer Games—the first summer held outside of the United States—took place in Dublin, Ireland. Approximately 7,000 athletes from 150 countries competed over 18 disciplines. The Dublin games were also the first to have their own opening and closing ceremonies broadcast live. President of Ireland Mary McAleese performed the ceremonial duties. The 2003 games dramatically changed the perceptions and attitudes of international society regarding the abilities and limitations of people with intellectual disabilities. The opening ceremony of the 2003 Games has been described by President McAleese as "a time when Ireland was at its superb best".

On October 30, 2004, President George W. Bush signed into law the "Special Olympics Sport and Empowerment Act", Public Law 108–406. The bill authorized funding for its Healthy Athletes, Education, and Worldwide Expansion programs. Co-sponsored by representatives Roy Blunt (R-MO), and Steny Hoyer (D-MD), and senators Rick Santorum (R-PA) and Harry Reid (D-NV), the bills were passed by unanimous consent in both chambers. In July 2006, the first Special Olympics USA Games were held at Iowa State University. Teams from all 50 states and the District of Columbia participated.

In May 2016, Mary Davis of Dublin, Ireland, was named chief executive officer. She is the first CEO from outside the U.S. in the organization's history. From 2017 to 2019, U.S. secretary of education Betsy DeVos attempted to eliminate federal funding for the Special Olympics. Each year the attempt was rejected by Congress, and the public outcry following a third annual attempt resulted in the funding being maintained in 2019. As part of the Special Olympics 50th Anniversary celebration in 2018, a new mission called the "Inclusion Revolution" was launched.

== Symbols ==
The Special Olympics logo is based on the sculpture "Joy and Happiness to All the Children of the World" by Zurab Tsereteli. The State University of New York, Brockport, played host to the 1979 Summer Games and Tsereteli was then a visiting artist in residence at the university. He worked with the Kennedy Foundation and gifted the sculpture to the University. The "stick figure" is an abstract but humanistic form designed to convey the impression of movement and activity. The logo is meant to be a symbol of growth, confidence and joy among children and adults with disabilities.

In 2018, the Chicago Park District dedicated the "Eternal Flame of Hope" in honor of the Special Olympics. The 30 foot (9.1 m) sculpture by Richard Hunt stands in a plaza next to Soldier Field, where the first games were held 50 years earlier in 1968. The Flame of Hope is the name given to the torch that is carried to and lit at Special Olympics games.

== Hosts of the Special Olympics World Games ==
Special Olympics World Games hosts
Year	Summer Special Olympics World Games			Winter Special Olympics World Games		
Year	No.	Host	Date(s)	No.	Host	Date(s)
1968	1	Chicago, United States	July 20 – August 3			
1970	2	Chicago, United States	August 13–15			
1972	3	Los Angeles, United States	August 13–18			
1975	4	Mount Pleasant, United States	August 8–13			
1977				1	Steamboat Springs, United States	February 5–11
1979	5	Brockport, United States	August 8–13			
1981				2	Smugglers' Notch and Stowe, United States	March 8–13
1983	6	Baton Rouge, United States	July 12–18			
1985				3	Park City, United States	March 24–29
1987	7	Notre Dame and South Bend, United States	July 31 – August 1			
1989				4	Lake Tahoe and Reno, United States	April 1–8
1991	8	Minneapolis and Saint Paul, United States	July 19–27			
1993				5	Salzburg and Schladming, Austria	March 20–27
1995	9	New Haven, United States	July 1–9			
1997				6	Collingwood and Toronto, Canada	February 1–8
1999	10	Chapel Hill, Durham and Raleigh, United States	June 26 – July 4			
2001				7	Anchorage, United States	March 4–11
2003	11	(Republic of Ireland) Dublin, Ireland	June 21–29			
2005				8	Nagano, Japan	February 26 – March 4
2007	12	Shanghai, China	October 2–11			
2009				9	Boise, United States^{(1)}	February 6–13
2011	13	Athens, Greece	June 25 – July 4			
2013				10	Pyeongchang, South Korea	January 29 – February 5
2015	14	Los Angeles, United States	July 25 – August 2			
2017				11	Graz and Schladming, Austria	March 14–25
2019	15	Abu Dhabi, United Arab Emirates	March 14–21			
2022				-	Kazan, Russia	cancelled^{(2)}
2023	16	Berlin, Germany	June 17–25			
2025				12	Turin-Piedmont, Italy	March 8–15
2027	17	Santiago, Chile	October 16–24			
2029				13	Zürich-Graubünden, Switzerland	

^{1} Sarajevo, Bosnia and Herzegovina, was originally selected to host the 2009 Special Olympics World Winter Games. Due to financial problems and the constant delay in reconstruction of the venues of the 1984 Winter Olympics, the city gave up hosting the Games, and Boise, Idaho, was invited to host the event.

^{2} It was planned that Åre and Östersund, Sweden would host the 2021 World Winter Games between February 2 to 13, 2021. However, on December 20, 2019, it was announced that the Swedish Paralympic Committee vetoed the necessary financing for the continuity of the event in the country, invalidating a promise made during the bid process, Special Olympics was forced to delay the event and in 2020 the COVID-19 pandemic arose. Kazan, Russia was announced winter host for 2022 on June 29, 2020. On March 4, 2022, it was announced that the Kazan games would be cancelled due to safety and economic concerns arising from the 2022 Russian invasion of Ukraine.

== National programs ==
As of August 2026, 204 National Programs are grouped into seven geographic regions. Due to legal issues in some countries eight countries use their official in local languages.

Number	Region	Countries
1	Africa	40
2	Asia-Pacific	35
3	East Asia	6
4	Europe-Eurasia	58
5	Americas	43
6	Middle East and North Africa	22
Total	Special Olympics	204

=== Africa (40) ===
- Benin
- Botswana
- Burkina Faso
- Burundi
- Cape Verde
- Chad
- Democratic Republic of Congo
- Republic of Congo
- Equatorial Guinea
- Eswatini
- Ethiopia
- The Gambia
- Ghana
- Guinea
- Guinea Bissau
- Ivory Coast
- Kenya
- Lesotho
- Liberia
- Madagascar
- Malawi
- Mali
- Mauritius
- Mozambique
- Namibia
- Niger
- Nigeria
- Rwanda
- Senegal
- Seychelles
- South Africa
- South Sudan
- Tanzania
- Togo
- Uganda
- Zambia
- Zimbabwe

=== Asia-Pacific (35) ===
- Afghanistan
- American Samoa
- Australia
- Bangladesh (details)
- Bharat (India) (details)
- Bhutan
- Brunei
- Cambodia
- Fiji
- Guam
- Indonesia
- Kiribati
- Laos
- Malaysia
- Maldives
- Marshall Islands
- Micronesia
- Myanmar
- Nauru
- Nepal
- New Zealand
- Nippon (Japan)
- Pakistan (details)
- Palau
- Papua New Guinea
- Philippines
- Samoa
- Sri Lanka
- Singapore
- Solomon Islands
- Thailand
- Timor-Leste
- Tonga
- Vanuatu
- Vietnam

=== East Asia (6) ===
- China
- Chinese Taipei
- Hong Kong
- South Korea
- Macau
- Mongolia

=== Eurasia (58) ===
- Albania
- Andorra
- Armenia
- Austria
- Azerbaijan
- Belarus
- Belgium
- Bosnia and Herzegovina
- Bulgaria
- Croatia
- Cyprus
- Czech Republic
- Denmark
- Estonia (details)
- Faroe Islands
- Finland
- France
- Georgia
- Germany
- Gibraltar
- (United Kingdom) Great Britain (details)
- Greece
- Hungary
- Iceland
- Ireland (details)
- Isle of Man
- Israel
- Italy
- Kazakhstan
- Kosovo (details)
- Kyrgyzstan
- Latvia
- Liechtenstein
- Lithuania
- Luxembourg
- North Macedonia
- Malta
- Moldova
- Monaco
- Montenegro
- Netherlands
- Norway
- Poland
- Portugal
- Romania
- Russia
- San Marino
- Serbia
- Slovakia
- Slovenia
- Spain
- Sweden
- Switzerland
- Tajikistan
- Turkey
- Turkmenistan
- Ukraine
- Uzbekistan

=== Americas (43) ===
- Antigua and Barbuda
- Argentina
- Aruba
- Bahamas
- Barbados
- Belize
- Bermuda
- Bolivia
- Bonaire
- Brazil
- Canada (details)
- Cayman Islands
- Chile
- Colombia
- Costa Rica
- Cuba
- Curaçao
- Dominica
- Dominican Republic
- Ecuador
- El Salvador
- Guatemala
- Guadeloupe
- Guyana
- Haiti
- Honduras
- Jamaica
- Mexico (details)
- Nicaragua
- Panama
- Paraguay
- Peru
- Puerto Rico
- Saint Kitts and Nevis
- Saint Lucia
- Saint Vincent and the Grenadines
- Sint Maarten
- Suriname
- Trinidad and Tobago
- US Virgin Islands
- United States (details)
- Uruguay
- Venezuela

=== MENA (22) ===
- Algeria
- Bahrain
- Comoros
- Djibouti
- Egypt
- Iran
- Iraq
- Jordan
- Kuwait
- Lebanon
- Libya
- Mauritania
- Morocco
- Oman
- Palestine
- Qatar
- Saudi Arabia
- Sudan
- Syria
- Tunisia
- United Arab Emirates
- Yemen

== Participation ==
Special Olympics programs are available for athletes free of charge. More than 5.7 million athletes and Unified Sports partners are involved in Special Olympics sports training and competition in 204 countries and territories. The organization offers year-round training and competition in 32 Olympic-style summer and winter sports.

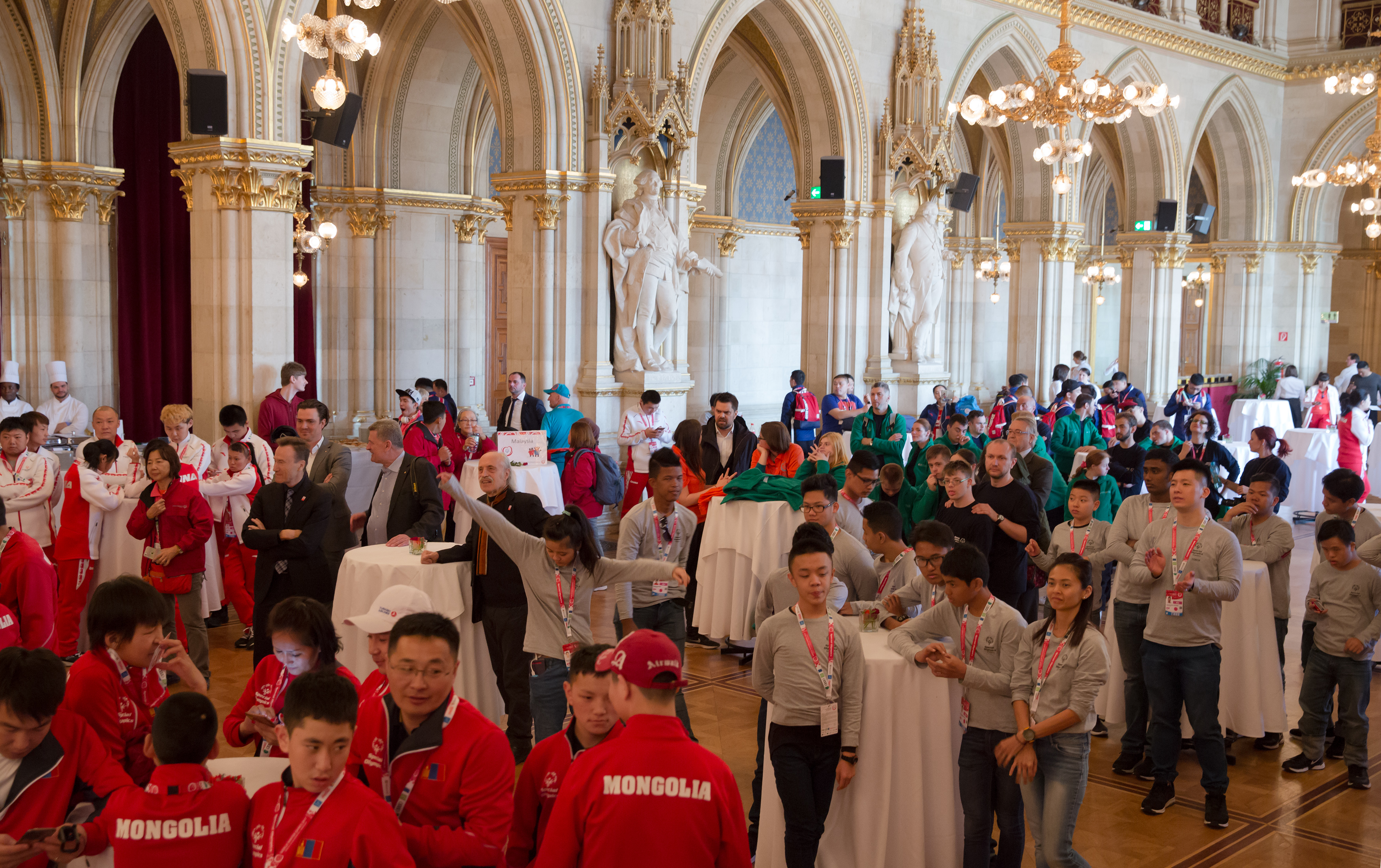
Special Olympics World Winter Games 2017 reception Vienna, Austria

People with intellectual disabilities are encouraged to join the Special Olympics for the physical activity, which helps lower the rate of cardiovascular disease and obesity, among other health benefits. Also, they gain many emotional and psychological benefits, including self-confidence, social competence, building greater athletic skills and higher self-esteem. Exercise has also been shown to be related to a decrease in anxiety levels amongst people with intellectual disabilities.

To participate in the Special Olympics, a person must be at least 8 years old and identified by an agency or professional as having one of the following conditions: intellectual disabilities, cognitive delays as measured by formal assessment, or significant learning or vocational problems due to cognitive delay that require or have required specially designed instruction. For young people with and without intellectual disabilities ages 2–7, Special Olympics has a Young Athletes program—an inclusive sport and play program with a focus on activities that are important to mental and physical growth. Children engage in games and activities that develop motor skills and hand-eye coordination. Parents say their children in Young Athletes also develop better social skills. The confidence boost makes it easier for them to play and talk with other children on the playground and elsewhere. A study by the Center for Social Development and Education (University of Massachusetts, Boston) found that the activities also had the effect of helping children with intellectual disabilities learn routines and approaches to learning, along with how to follow rules and directions.

Families can also get involved with the Special Olympics experience. Family members support their athletes to the best of their ability, which may involve attending or volunteering at the events. By being involved they can boost their athlete's self-esteem and will be looked at as a constant source of encouragement.

Volunteers and supporters are an integral part of Special Olympics—and millions of people around the world are committed to its programs. Some are sponsors or donors. Many others are coaches, event volunteers and fans.

Coaches help the athletes be the best they can be regardless of ability—or disability. Special Olympics trains coaches through the Coaching Excellence program, which includes partnering with sports organizations. Special Olympics volunteers are introduced to lifetime friendships and great rewards.

There are many events in which families and volunteers participate, but the biggest event is the Law Enforcement Torch Run, which involves police chiefs, police officers, secret service, FBI agents, military police, sheriffs, state troopers, prison guards, and other law enforcement personnel assembling to raise awareness and funds for Special Olympics. Ahead of a Special Olympics competition, law enforcement officers carry the torch in intervals along a planned route covering most of the state or country to the site of the opening ceremonies of the chapter or Special Olympics World Summer or Winter Games. Then they pass the torch to a Special Olympics athlete and together they run up to the cauldron and light it, signifying the beginning of the games.

The Special Olympics athlete's oath, which was first introduced by Eunice Kennedy Shriver at the inaugural Special Olympics international games in Chicago in 1968, is "Let me win. But if I cannot win, let me be brave in the attempt." The oath originated with Herbert J. Kramer, then public relations advisor to the Kennedy Foundation.

== Sports offered ==
In 1968, track and field, swimming, and floor hockey were the first three official sports offered by Special Olympics. As in the Olympics, events are introduced in training and then added to the competitive schedule, and from there the list of sports and events continued to grow.

Special Olympics has more than 30 Olympic-type individual and team sports that provide meaningful training and competition opportunities for people with intellectual disabilities. As of 2016, these are:

- Athletics (Track and field)
- Basketball
- Boccia
- Bowling
- Cricket
- Cycling
- Equestrian
- Figure skating
- Floorball
- Floor hockey
- Football (soccer)
- Golf
- Gymnastics: Artistic and rhythmic
- Handball
- Judo
- Karate
- Kayaking
- Netball
- Powerlifting
- Roller skating
- Sailing
- Snowboarding
- Snowshoe running
- Skiing: Alpine and cross-country
- Softball
- Speed skating: Short-track
- Swimming: Pool and open-water
- Table tennis
- Tennis
- Triathlon
- Volleyball

Other sports and sports-related programs include the Motor Activity Training Program and beach volleyball. Availability of sports can depend on location and season.

A key difference between Special Olympics competitions and those of other sports organizations is that athletes of all ability levels are encouraged to participate. Competitions are structured so that athletes compete with other athletes of similar ability in equitable divisions. An athlete's ability is the primary factor in divisioning Special Olympics competitions. The ability of an athlete or team is determined by an entry score from a prior competition or the result of a seeding round or preliminary event at the competition itself. Other factors that are significant in establishing competitive divisions are age and gender.

At competitions, medals are awarded for first, second, and third place in each event, and ribbons are awarded to athletes who finish in fourth through eighth place.

== Unified Sports ==
In recent years, Special Olympics has pioneered the concept of Unified Sports, bringing together athletes with and without intellectual disabilities as teammates. The basic concept is that training together and playing together can create a path to friendship and understanding. The program has expanded beyond the U.S. and North America: more than 1.4 million people worldwide now take part in Special Olympics Unified Sports. The goal is to break down stereotypes about people with intellectual disabilities and promote unity.

Building on this, Special Olympics launched "The Revolution Is Inclusion", inviting people worldwide to sign the Inclusion Pledge. This campaign aimed at celebrating all abilities began as Special Olympics marked its 50th anniversary.

A recent study of Special Olympics Unified Sports in Serbia, Poland, Ukraine, Germany and Hungary documented the benefits of Unified Sports, including the effect of changing attitudes toward people with intellectual disabilities. As one Unified Sports partner said, "I am ashamed to say that I used to laugh at these people (people with intellectual disabilities), now I will tell anybody to stop laughing if I see it and I will stand up for people if I can." Other evaluations have also shown Unified Sports to be successful in building self-esteem and confidence in people with intellectual disabilities and also as a way to improve understanding and acceptance of people with intellectual disabilities among their non-disabled peers.

The Special Olympics Europe Eurasia Regional Research centre is based at the University of Ulster Jordanstown.

As part of their 50th anniversary, the Special Olympics created the first Unified Cup. The first competition is a soccer tournament with 440 athletes from 24 countries.

Unified Robotics, a program that pairs Special Olympics students with FIRST Robotics students to build robots, began in 2016, and has been bringing opportunities for technological skill development to Special Olympics students in Washington state, Arizona, and in other regions since. Special Olympics Arizona also promotes inclusion through Unified Arts programming including robotics, music, photography, art competitions, and gardening.

== Healthy Athletes ==
As the Special Olympics began to grow, staffers and volunteers began to notice that athletes—children and adults with intellectual disabilities—also had many untreated health problems. In 1997, Special Olympics began an initiative called Healthy Athletes, which offers health screenings to athletes in need.

Healthy Athletes currently offers health screenings in eight areas: Fit Feet (podiatry), FUNfitness (physical therapy), Health Promotion (better health and well-being), Healthy Hearing (audiology), MedFest (sports physical exam), Opening Eyes (vision), Special Smiles (dentistry), Strong Minds (Emotional Health). Screenings educate athletes on health and also identify problems that may need additional follow-up. For example, the FUNfitness Program assess flexibility, strength, balance, and aerobic fitness of the athlete. Following the screen, the physical therapist would provide instructions on how to optimize their physical fitness in the areas screened.

Since the Healthy Athletes program began, Special Olympics has become the largest global public health organization dedicated to serving people with intellectual disabilities. So far, more than 1.9 million Healthy Athletes screenings have been conducted for people with intellectual disabilities all around the world.

The Special Olympics health initiative has attracted high-profile partners, including the Hear the World Foundation, which screened more than 1,000 athletes during the most recent World Winter Games in Korea; more than 200 of them were found to have hearing loss.

In 2012, the Special Olympics Healthy Communities initiative launched in eight countries—Kazakhstan, Malawi, Malaysia, Mexico, Peru, Romania, South Africa and Thailand, as well as six U.S. states. The goal is to improve the health and well-being of people with intellectual disabilities and allow them to reach their full potential.

== Criticism ==
Scholar Keith Storey summarized common objections in a 2004 article in the Journal of Disability Policy Studies. One criticism directed at the organization pertains to the role that corporate sponsors play in it, which critics feel has led to degrading paternalism toward athletic ability. While corporate fundraising makes the games possible, critics argue, it provides good public relations for the sponsors, but does not result in integration of people with disabilities into the workforce at those companies. People with disabilities are also not widely represented on the Special Olympics' board of directors, as only two members have disabilities. This has been criticized as a double standard that reflects poorly on the disability rights movement where people with disabilities control the service delivery system rather than relying on people without disabilities.

== See also ==
- Paralympics
- Deaflympics
- Flame of Hope
- Healthy Athletes
- Special Hockey
