= Philippines at the Special Olympics World Games =

- IOC code: PHI
- National federation: Special Olympics Pilipinas

Special Olympics World Games appearances (overview)
- 1991; 1995; 1999; 2003; 2007; 2011; 2015; 2019; 2023; 2027

The Philippines has participated in the Special Olympics World Games in every edition since the 1991 edition. The team won nine gold medals in the 2007 games, the most it ever had at that time. They have since surpassed that total during the 2015 games, when the team won a total of 64 medals, including 24 gold.

The delegation is backed by Special Olympics Pilipinas (Special Olympics Philippines prior to 2021)

As of 2025, The Philippines became the first Asia-Pacific nation to join the Special Olympics Global Coalition for Inclusion, forging collaboration between DepEd and Special Olympics Pilipinas. The initiative aims to promote inclusive education across 500 schools and involve tens of thousands of students in Unified Sports.

== Medals ==
Event	**Gold**	**Silver**	**Bronze**	Total	Athletes
1968 Chicago –1987 Notre Dame	Did not enter				
1991 Minneapolis / St. Paul		1	1		
1995 New Haven					
1999 Chapel Hill					
2003 Dublin					
2007 Shanghai	9			53	
2011 Athens	21	13	15	49	38
2015 Los Angeles	24	19	21	64	35
2019 Abu Dhabi	9	10	10	29	39
2023 Berlin	4	1	1	6	8
**Total**					

Best performances in bold.
