= 1972 Special Olympics World Summer Games =

Multi-sport event held in Los Angeles, California, US

3rd Special Olympics World Summer Games
- Host city: Los Angeles, California, United States
- Nations: 8
- Athletes: ~ 2,500 to 3,000
- Opening: August 13, 1972
- Closing: August 18, 1972

Summer

1972 Special Olympics was the third edition of the Special Olympics World Games held in Los Angeles, California, the United States, from August 13 to August 18, 1972. This event was co-sponsored by the Joseph P. Kennedy Jr. Foundation and the Western Special Olympics, Inc. About 2,500 to 3,000 youngsters from eight countries including the United States, Canada, Mexico, and France participated. This event was held on the campuses of University of California, Los Angeles and Santa Monica College.
