= Mexico at the Special Olympics World Games =

Flag of Mexico

Mexico has competed at the Special Olympics World Games 11 times.

== Medal tallies ==
=== Special Olympics World Winter Games ===
Event	Gold	Silver	Bronze	Total	Ranking	Athletes
2009 Special Olympics World Winter Games	1	0	2	3		24
Mexico Total						

==== Image:Med_1.png Gold medalists ====
- 2009 Special Olympics World Winter Games
  - José Visiconty: Figure Skating Men's Singles Division 6

==== Image:Med_3.png Bronze medalists ====
- 2009 Special Olympics World Winter Games
  - Brenda Monreal and José Visiconty: Figure Skating Pairs Division 1
  - Juan Ruiz: Figure Skating Men's Singles Division 6

==== Other Results ====
- 2009 Special Olympics World Winter Games
  - 4th: Mexican mixed Floor hockey team: Floor Hockey Mixed Competition Division I - Lost to Spain for 3rd place
    - Team members: Lilia Aguilar, Luis Baca, Saúl Campos, Juan Carrillo, Jesús García, Loreto López, Roberto Manzanares, Armando Murillo, Ever Ochoa, Angel Ortiz, Ever Ortiz, Hector Pacheco, Rosaura Reyes, Luz Rico, Beatriz Rivera and Jorge Sandoval.
  - 4th: Tomás Arenazas: Figure Skating Men's Singles Division 5
  - 4th: Brenda Monreal: Figure Skating Women's Singles Division 1
  - 6th: Alonso Flores: Figure Skating Men's Singles Division 6
  - 6th: Rosa María Rodríguez: Figure Skating Women's Singles Division 2
  - 7th: Jenny Arcos: Figure Skating Women's Singles Division 3
  - 7th: Karen Borges: Figure Skating Women's Singles Division 1

== See also ==
- Mexico at the Olympics
- Mexico at the Paralympics
