= 1968 Special Olympics World Summer Games =

Multi-sport event in Chicago, Illinois, US

1st Special Olympics World Summer Games
- Host city: Chicago, Illinois, United States
- Nations: 3
- Athletes: 1,000
- Events: 3 sports
- Opening: July 20
- Closing: July 20
- Athlete's Oath: Eunice Shriver
- Torch lighter: "James", a seventeen-year-old young man
- Main venue: Soldier Field
- Venues: 2

Summer

The 1968 Special Olympics World Summer Games were held Chicago, Illinois, United States, on July 20, 1968. Most of the event was held at Soldier Field, while some of the smaller indoor aspects were held in the Conrad Hilton Hotel. The event was co-sponsored by the Chicago Park District and the Joseph P. Kennedy Jr. Foundation.

1,000 athletes from 26 U.S. states, Canada, and France competed in track and swimming.

The athlete's oath was introduced at these games by founder Eunice Shriver at the opening ceremony. The oath is, "Let me win. But if I can not win, let me be brave in the attempt."

== Planning and logistics ==
The inception of the concept for the Special Olympics came from Anne McGlone (now Anne Burke), at the time a physical education teacher working for the Chicago Park District. In 1967, while teaching special needs children, she had the idea to host a citywide track meet for such children. She asked Park District Superintendent Erwin "Red" Weiner and Park District Board President William McFetridge for permission to organize it. The Joseph P. Kennedy Jr. Foundation had provided earlier funding to special needs programs in the Park District, thus McFetridge believed that Eunice Kennedy Shriver might be willing to provide funding for such an event. In early 1968, McGlone wrote to Shriver proposing the event, and within days received an enthusiastic response from Shriver. The event evolved from a track meet into an Olympics-style event for special needs children.

To assist in organizing the event, they received help from Dr. William H. Freeberg of Southern Illinois University, who was an expert in recreation for children with disabilities. They also received the assistance of Parks Board vice president Dan Shannon and McFetridge's assistant Ed Kelly. The event began to take a national, then later even an international, scale as planning advanced. The games were held on a budget of roughly $50,000.

Notable athletes volunteered at the games, including Jesse Owens, Rafer Johnson, George Armstrong, and Stan Mikita.

== Sports ==
- Track and field
  - 50-yard dash
  - 300-yard run
  - Long jump
  - High jump
  - Softball throw
- Swimming
  - 25-yard swim
  - 100-yard swim
  - Water polo
- Floor hockey

1,000 athletes from 26 U.S. states, Canada, and France competed in track and swimming. Swimming had two events including 25 meter races, and track and field had four events including 50 yard dash, 300 yard run, and standing long jump. There was also a softball throwing event.

== Aftermath ==
The inaugural event was very modest in comparison to later editions. Only several hundred spectators attended, with most being relatives of competitors. However, there event was nevertheless a successful proof of concept for the Special Olympics movement. In December, the charitable nonprofit "Special Olympics, Inc." was established. The Special Olympics continue to be held, and have significantly expanded in scope.

Preceded by N/A	Special Olympics World Summer Games	Succeeded by Chicago, United States
