= 2022 Special Olympics World Winter Games =

Cancelled multi-sport event in Kazan, Russia

12th Special Olympics World Winter Games 12-е Всемирные зимние игры Специальной Олимпиады
- Host city: Kazan, Russia
- Events: 7 sports
- Opening: Cancelled
- Website: (site's closed, sold for GoDaddy.)

Summer

Winter

The 2022 Special Olympics World Winter Games (Russian: Всемирные зимние игры Специальной Олимпиады 2022 г.) were a cancelled international multi-sport event for athletes with intellectual disabilities planned to be held in Kazan, Russia on January 21–27. They would have been the 12th edition of the Special Olympics World Winter Games to be held by the Special Olympics International.

== Host selection ==
The Games were originally planned to be held in Åre and Östersund, Sweden in 2021. However, on December 20, 2019, the Swedish Paralympic Committee announced that they would cancel their plans on conducting the Games there due to insufficient funds to organize the event. On June 29, 2020, it was announced that Kazan, Russia would host the 12th Special Olympics World Winter Games in 2022.

== Postponement and cancellation ==
The Games would have been held between January 22–28, 2022 but were postponed to January 2023 due to the COVID-19 pandemic. Following the Russian invasion of Ukraine, Special Olympics International decided to cancel the event due to logistical and athlete safety issues.

== Sports ==
A total of seven sports at five different venues were planned to be competed on the 2022 Special Olympics:

- Alpine skiing
- Cross-country skiing
- Figure skating
- Floorball
- Short track speed skating
- Snowboarding
- Snowshoeing

== Venues ==
Five venues were planned to be used for the 2022 Special Olympics:

- Burevestnik Stadium
- Kazan Tennis Academy
- Skiing and Biathlon Complex
- Sports Palace
- Sviyaga Alpine Skiing Complex

Preceded by Graz and Schladming, Austria	Special Olympics World Winter Games	Succeeded by Turin, Italy
