= 2013 Special Olympics World Winter Games =

Multi-sport event in Pyeongchang, South Korea

10th Special Olympics World Winter Games
- Host city: Pyeongchang
- Country: South Korea
- Motto: Together We Can! (함께라면 할 수 있어!)
- Events: –
- Opening: January 29
- Closing: February 5
- Opened by: Lee Myung-bak
- Main venue: Gangneung Indoor Ice Rink

Summer

Winter

The 2013 Special Olympics World Winter Games (Korean: 2013년 동계 스페셜 올림픽 세계대회) or 10th Special Olympics World Winter Games (제10회 동계 스페셜 올림픽 세계대회) was a Special Olympics, a multi-sports event that was held in Pyeongchang, South Korea from January 29 through February 5, 2013. Though officially allocated to Pyeongchang, events were also held in Gangneung Indoor Ice Rink.

== Venues ==
The three venues and events are:

- Yongpyong Ski Resort, alpine skiing
- Gangneung Indoor Ice Rink, ceremonies and figure skating
- Alpensia Resort, everything else, including sales

== The Games ==
=== Participating Special Olympic National Programs ===
Participating Special Olympic Committees
- Afghanistan
- Algeria
- Andorra
- Argentina
- Armenia
- Australia
- Austria
- Azerbaijan
- Bahrain
- Bangladesh
- Belgium
- Bharat
- Bolivia
- Bosnia and Herzegovina
- Brazil
- Bulgaria
- Cambodia
- Canada
- Chile
- China
- Costa Rica
- Croatia
- Cyprus
- Czech Republic
- Denmark
- Djibouti
- Dominican Republic
- Egypt
- El Salvador
- Estonia
- Finland
- France
- Georgia
- Germany
- Gibraltar
- Great Britain
- Hellas
- Hong Kong
- Hungary
- Iceland
- Indonesia
- Iraq
- Ireland
- Isle of Man
- Italy
- Jamaica
- Jordan
- Kazakhstan
- Kenya
- South Korea
- Kosovo
- Latvia
- Lebanon
- Libya
- Liechtenstein
- Lithuania
- Luxembourg
- Macao
- Macedonia
- Malaysia
- Mauritania
- Mexico
- Moldova
- Monaco
- Mongolia
- Montenegro
- Morocco
- Nepal
- Netherlands
- New Zealand
- Nigeria
- Nippon
- Norway
- Oman
- Pakistan
- Palestine
- Papua New Guinea
- Poland
- Qatar
- Romania
- Russia
- San Marino
- Saudi Arabia
- Serbia
- Singapore
- Slovakia
- Slovenia
- South Africa
- Spain
- Sweden
- Switzerland
- Syria
- Tajikistan
- United States
- Chinese Taipei
- Thailand
- Trinidad and Tobago
- Tunisia
- Turkey
- Turkmenistan
- Uganda
- Ukraine
- United Arab Emirates
- Uzbekistan
- Venezuela
- Vietnam

=== Sports ===
The 2013 Special Olympics World Winter Games programme featured 8 sports with encompassing many disciplines (in parentheses).

- Alpine skiing (9)
  - 10M Walk
  - Advanced Giant Slalom
  - Advanced Super G
  - Glide
  - Intermediate Giant Slalom
  - Intermediate Super G
  - Novice Giant Slalom
  - Novice Super G
- Cross-country skiing (10)
  - 100M Race Classical
  - 1K Divisioning Round
  - 500M Race Freestyle
  - 50M Race Classical
  - 5K (7.5K & 10K) Divisioning
- Figure skating (5)
  - Ice Dancing
  - Ice Dancing Team
  - Pairs
  - Singles
  - Unified Pairs
- Floorball (1)
  - Team
- Floor hockey (3)
  - Team
  - Unified Team
- Short track speed skating (9)
  - 111M Race
  - 111M Race (semi & Final)
  - 222M Race
  - 333M Race
  - 500M Race
  - 500M Race (Semi & Final)
  - 777M Race
  - 777M Race (Semi & Final)
  - 1000 Race
  - 1500M Race
  - 25M Straight
  - 55M Half LapSnowboarding
- Snowboarding (9)
  - Advanced Giant Slalom
  - Advanced Slalom
  - Intermediate Giant Slalom
  - Intermediate Slalom
- Snowshoeing (10)
  - 25M Race
  - 50M Race
  - 100M Race
  - 200M Race
  - 400M Race
  - 800M Race
  - 1600M Race
  - 4X100M Relay
  - 4X400M Race
  - 5K Race

=== Calendar ===
OC	Opening ceremony	●	Event competitions	1	Gold medals	EG	Exhibition gala	CC	Closing ceremony

January/February	29 Tue	30 Wed	31 Thu	1 Fri	2 Sat	3 Sun	4 Mon	5 Tue	Gold medals
Ceremonies	OC							CC	
Alpine skiing		●	●	●	●	●	●	●	
Cross-country skiing		●	●	●	●	●	●	●	
Figure skating		●	●	●	●	●			
Floorball		●	●						
Floor hockey			●	●	●	●	●	●	
Short track speed skating		●	●	●	●	●	●		
Snowboarding		●	●	●	●	●	●		
Snowshoeing		●	●	●	●	●	●	●	
January/February	29 Tue	30 Wed	31 Thu	1 Fri	2 Sat	3 Sun	4 Mon	5 Tue	Gold medals

=== Mascots ===
The mascots are Ra, In and Bow, a bear, sheep and dog respectively, whose names form the word "rainbow".

Preceded by Idaho, Boise, United States	Special Olympics World Winter Games	Succeeded by Graz and Schladming, Austria
