= 1983 Special Olympics World Summer Games =

Multi-sport event in Baton Rouge, Louisiana, US

The 1983 Special Olympics World Summer Games were held in Baton Rouge, Louisiana, United States, on the campus of Louisiana State University from July 12–18, 1983. Events included athletics, Softball Throw and Swimming.

This was the first Special Olympics World Summer Games to feature Special Olympics New Zealand over thirty years ago, since then over 300 athletes have traveled to Special Olympics Events Internationally representing Special Olympics New Zealand.

The games featured 4,000 athletes from 50 nations, the most of any Summer Special Olympics up to that point (exceeding the 3,500 athletes from 24 countries that participated in the 1979 games).

More than 60,000 spectators attended the games.

Thirteen sports were offered. The sport of powerlifting (Special Olympics) was represented for the first time.

Preceded by Brockport, United States	Special Olympics World Summer Games	Succeeded by Notre Dame-South Bend, United States
