= 2017 Special Olympics World Winter Games =

Multi-sport event in Graz and Schladming, Austria

11th Special Olympics World Winter Games
- Host city: Graz and Schladming, Austria
- Motto: Heartbeat For The World (German: Herzschlag für die Welt)
- Nations: 113
- Athletes: 2,277 (1,555 Male & 722 Female)
- Events: 27 events (9 sports)
- Opening: March 18
- Closing: March 26
- Opened by: Alexander Van der Bellen

Summer

Winter

The 2017 Special Olympic World Winter Games (German: 2017 Special Olympics World Winterspiele) officially called 11th Special Olympics World Winter Games were a multi-sports event that was held in Austria from March 14 through March 25, 2017.

== Overview ==
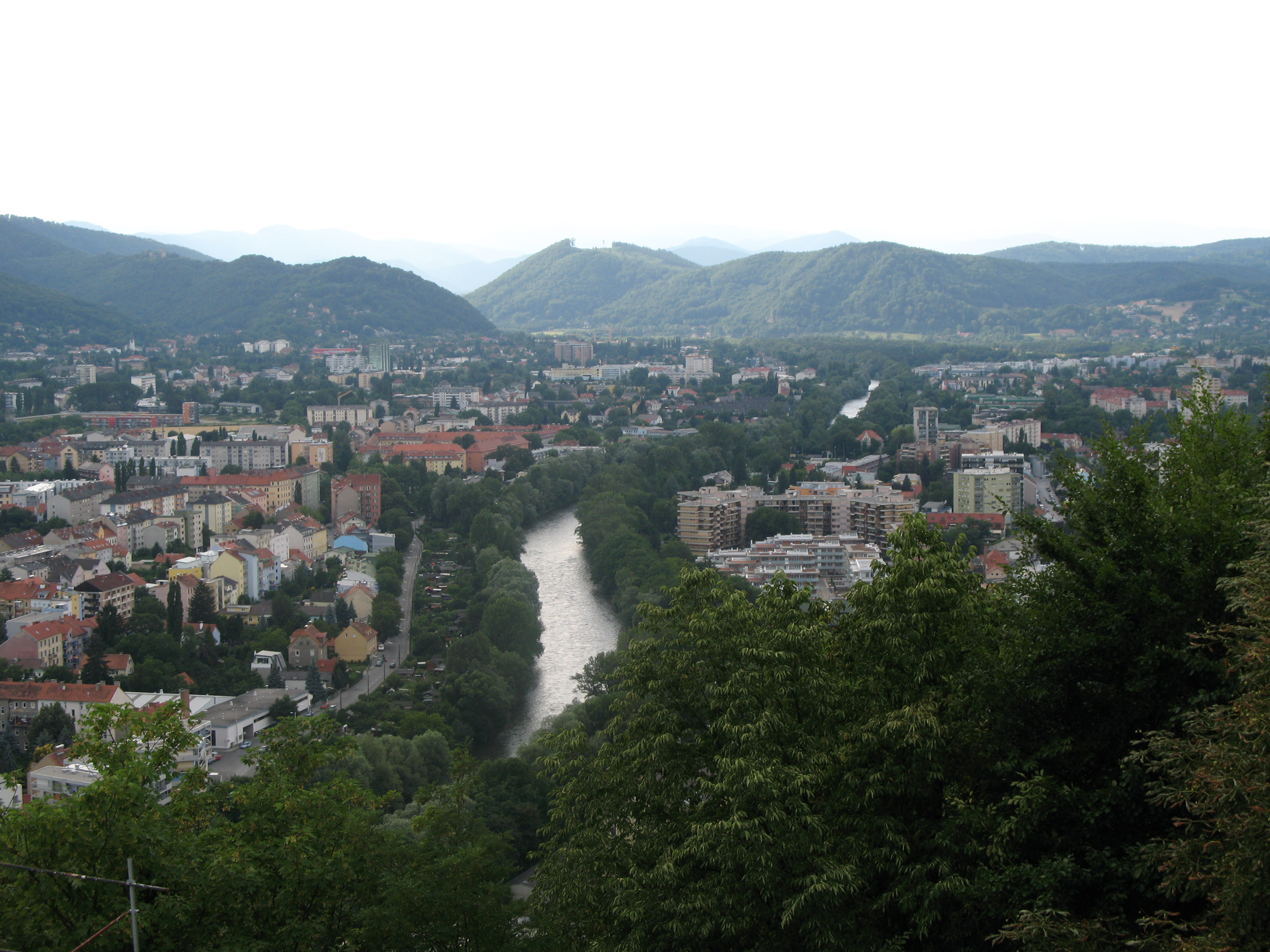
City of Graz which won the bidding and is holding the 11th Winter Special Olympic World Games

It was announced in 2012 that the host city for the 2017 Special Olympics World Winter Games would be Graz and Schladming in Styria, Austria.

The opening and closing ceremonies were broadcast in the United States on ABC and ESPN. Most events were played live or re-aired on ESPN, ESPN2 and ESPNNEWS throughout the games.

== The games ==
=== Reception ===
With 113 nations participating all were invited to the Official Reception in Vienna after the teams arrived. At the Reception teams and nations could meet other athletes, take photos and talk to media from all over the world. This was the Special Olympics World Games first time that this event was held. The Reception took place on March 16, 2017, at the Vienna, Rathaus.

==== Arrivals ====
Teams being welcomed at Vienna Airport
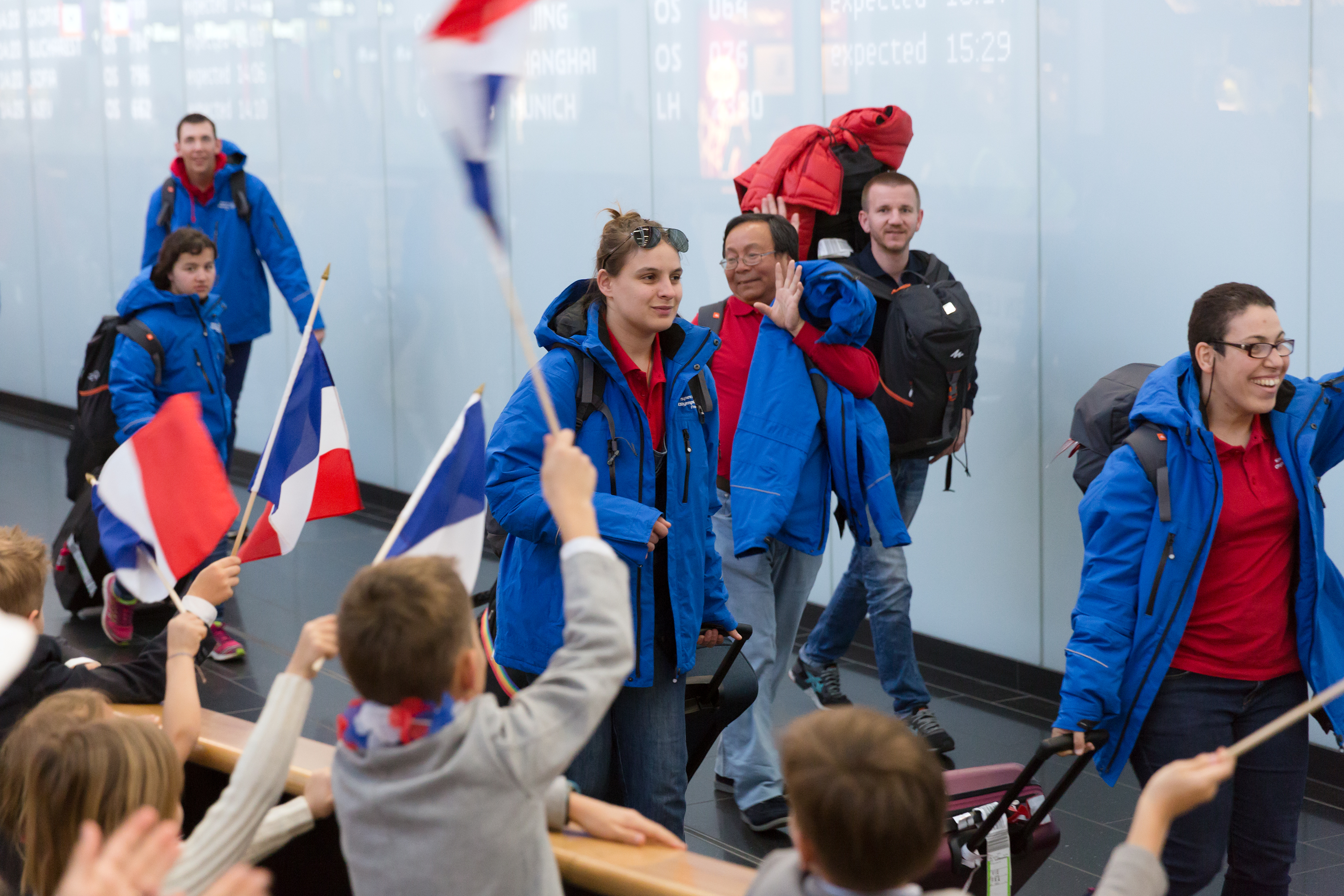
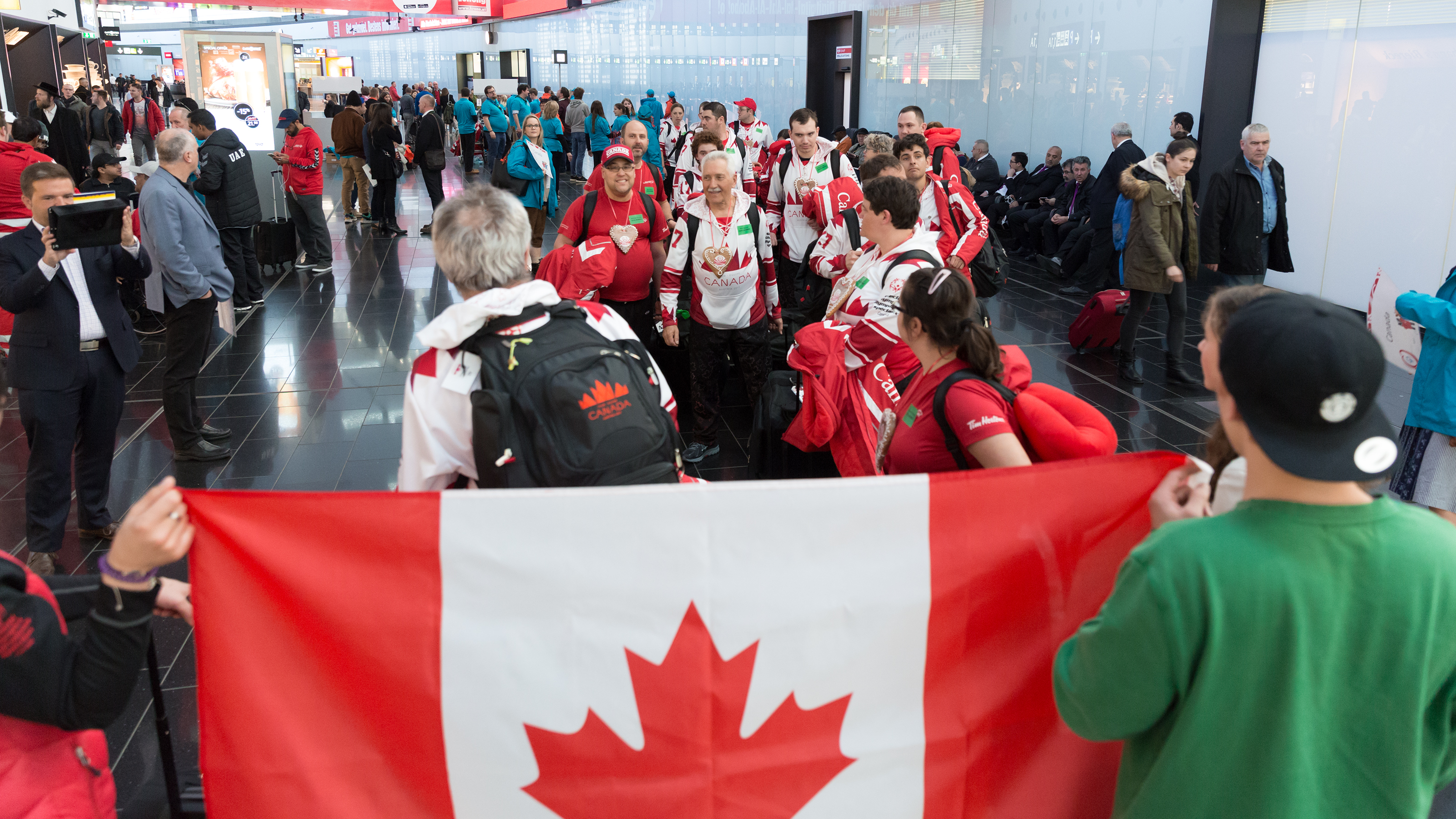
(left) France being welcomed at Vienna International Airport by supporters (right) Canada supporters hold the Canadian flag while welcoming the Canadian team to Vienna.

Most athletes arrived at Vienna International Airport on March 14, 2017, and were given Special Austria 2017 necklaces and gear for their stay.

The Austrian government denied the visas for teams from Ghana and Afghanistan, keeping them from competing. The grounds for denial conveyed to the Ghana team were that Austria believed that the athletes would not return to Ghana after the competition. Tim Shriver, chairman of the board of Special Olympics International, said: "On paper, six athletes of more than 2,500 did not attend the 2017 World Games. But for those six, it is a nightmare."

=== Opening ceremony ===
The opening ceremony was on March 18, 2017. The games were officially opened by Alexander Van der Bellen. Jason Mraz and Grace VanderWaal, with a choir of children from Schladming and Special Olympics global messengers, performed "I Won't Give Up." Helene Fischer performed "Fighter".

=== Nations participating ===
* Host nation

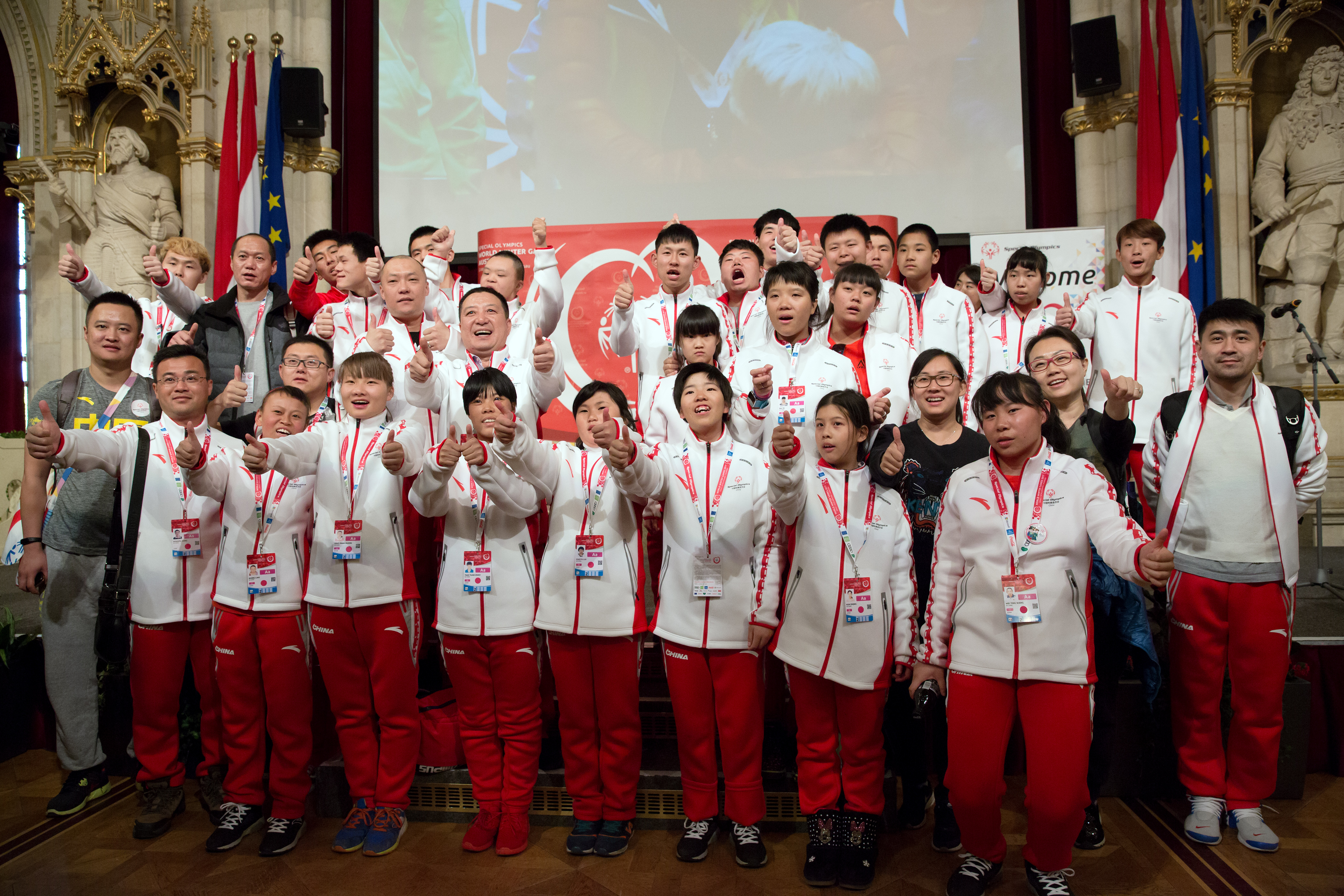
China at the 2017 Special Olympics Reception in Vienna, Austria

Nations participating
| | Athletes | | | |
| Country | Male | Female | Total | Events |
Africa
| Burkina Faso | 7 | 3 | 10 | floorball |
| Ivory Coast | 12 | 7 | 19 | floorball |
| Ghana | 10 | 0 | 10 | floorball |
| Kenya | 12 | 0 | 12 | floor hockey |
| Namibia | 13 | 7 | 20 | floorball |
| Nigeria | 20 | 0 | 20 | floorball, floor hockey |
| South Africa | 18 | 6 | 24 | floor hockey, figure skating, speed skating |
| Uganda | 16 | 0 | 16 | floor hockey |
Asia-Pacific
| Afghanistan | 2 | 2 | 4 | snowshoeing |
| Australia | 9 | 3 | 12 | alpine skiing, snowboarding |
| Bangladesh | 15 | 13 | 28 | floor hockey |
| Bharat | 45 | 45 | 90 | alpine skiing, floorball, floor hockey, figure skating, snowboarding, speed skating, snowshoeing |
| Indonesia | 8 | 0 | 8 | floorball |
| Malaysia | 2 | 2 | 4 | snowshoeing |
| New Zealand | 10 | 3 | 13 | alpine skiing, snowboarding |
| Pakistan | 6 | 6 | 12 | cross-country skiing, snowshoeing |
| Serendib | 6 | 2 | 8 | floorball |
| Singapore | 13 | 1 | 14 | floorball, speed skating |
East Asia
| China | 44 | 32 | 76 | cross-country skiing, floor hockey, figure skating, speed skating snowshoeing |
| Chinese Taipei | 26 | 14 | 40 | floor hockey, figure skating, speed skating, snowshoeing |
| Hong Kong | 31 | 16 | 37 | floor hockey, figure skating, speed skating, snowshoeing |
| Nippon | 37 | 17 | 54 | alpine skiing, cross-country skiing, floor hockey, figure skating, snowboarding, speed skating, snowshoeing |
| South Korea | 46 | 19 | 65 | alpine skiing, cross-country skiing, floor hockey, figure skating, snowboarding |
| Macau | 5 | 5 | 10 | figure skating, speed skating, snowshoeing |
| Mongolia | 12 | 2 | 14 | cross-country skiing, floorball, snowshoeing |
Europe\Eurasia
| Andorra | 4 | 1 | 5 | alpine skiing |
| Armenia | 1 | 0 | 1 | cross-country skiing |
| Austria* | 230 | 90 | 320 | alpine skiing, cross-country skiing, floorball, floor hockey, figure skating, snowboarding, speed skating, snowshoeing, stick shooting |
| Azerbaijan | 10 | 0 | 10 | floorball |
| Belarus | 9 | 0 | 9 | cross-country skiing |
| Belgium | 15 | 11 | 26 | alpine skiing, cross-country skiing, snowboarding, snowshoeing |
| Bosnia and Herzegovina | 8 | 8 | 16 | alpine skiing, cross-country skiing |
| Bulgaria | 4 | 4 | 8 | alpine skiing, cross-country skiing, snowshoeing |
| Croatia | 19 | 10 | 29 | alpine skiing, cross-country skiing, floorball, figure skating, speed skating, snowshoeing |
| Cyprus | 16 | 6 | 22 | floorball, floor hockey |
| Czech Republic | 21 | 11 | 32 | alpine skiing, cross-country skiing, floorball, snowboarding |
| Denmark | 10 | 4 | 14 | alpine skiing, cross-country skiing, floorball, figure skating |
| Estonia | 12 | 4 | 16 | cross-country skiing, floorball |
| Finland | 25 | 9 | 34 | alpine skiing, cross-country skiing, floorball, figure skating, snowboarding, snowshoeing |
| France | 16 | 13 | 29 | alpine skiing, cross-country skiing, snowshoeing |
| Macedonia | 1 | 0 | 1 | alpine skiing |
| Georgia | 2 | 5 | 7 | alpine skiing, figure skating, snowshoeing |
| Germany | 48 | 27 | 75 | alpine skiing, cross-country skiing, floorball, figure skating, snowboarding, speed skating, snowshoeing, stick shooting |
| Gibraltar | 14 | 1 | 15 | alpine skiing, floorball, snowshoeing |
| Great Britain | 9 | 12 | 21 | alpine skiing, figure skating |
| Hellas | 12 | 2 | 14 | alpine skiing, cross-country skiing, snowshoeing |
| Hungary | 23 | 10 | 33 | alpine skiing, floor hockey, figure skating, speed skating, snowshoeing |
| Iceland | 2 | 2 | 4 | figure skating |
| Ireland | 24 | 2 | 26 | alpine skiing, floorball |
| Isle of Man | 9 | 3 | 12 | floorball, snowshoeing |
| Israel | 12 | 2 | 14 | floorball, snowshoeing |
| Italy | 21 | 13 | 34 | alpine skiing, cross-country skiing, snowboarding, snowshoeing |
| Kazakhstan | 14 | 12 | 26 | alpine skiing, cross-country skiing, figure skating, snowboarding, snowshoeing |
| Kosovo | 1 | 1 | 2 | alpine skiing |
| Kyrgyzstan | 2 | 1 | 3 | alpine skiing, speed skating |
| Latvia | 14 | 6 | 20 | cross-country skiing, floorball, snowshoeing |
| Liechtenstein | 4 | 4 | 8 | alpine skiing, cross-country skiing |
| Lithuania | 25 | 4 | 29 | cross-country skiing, floor hockey, snowshoeing |
| Luxembourg | 13 | 11 | 24 | alpine skiing, cross-country skiing, snowshoeing, stick shooting |
| Moldova | 2 | 0 | 2 | speed skating |
| Monaco | 17 | 6 | 23 | alpine skiing, cross-country skiing, snowshoeing |
| Montenegro | 4 | 2 | 6 | alpine skiing, snowshoeing |
| Netherlands | 15 | 10 | 25 | alpine skiing, cross-country skiing, snowboarding, speed skating |
| Norway | 23 | 12 | 35 | alpine skiing, cross-country skiing, floorball, snowboarding, speed skating |
| Poland | 32 | 14 | 46 | alpine skiing, cross-country skiing, floor hockey, speed skating, snowshoeing |
| Romania | 9 | 6 | 15 | alpine skiing, cross-country skiing, figure skating, snowshoeing |
| Russia | 50 | 29 | 79 | alpine skiing, cross-country skiing, floorball, floor hockey, figure skating, snowboarding, speed skating, snowshoeing |
| San Marino | 4 | 0 | 4 | alpine skiing, cross-country skiing, snowshoeing |
| Serbia | 10 | 9 | 19 | alpine skiing, cross-country skiing |
| Slovakia | 10 | 6 | 16 | alpine skiing, cross-country skiing, figure skating |
| Slovenia | 10 | 8 | 18 | alpine skiing, cross-country skiing, snowshoeing |
| Spain | 30 | 22 | 52 | alpine skiing, cross-country skiing, floor hockey, snowshoeing |
| Sweden | 30 | 11 | 41 | alpine skiing, cross-country skiing, floorball, floor hockey, figure skating, snowshoeing |
| Switzerland | 38 | 12 | 50 | alpine skiing, cross-country skiing, floorball, snowboarding |
| Tajikistan | 4 | 4 | 8 | cross-country skiing, snowshoeing |
| Turkmenistan | 2 | 1 | 3 | figure skating, speed skating |
| Ukraine | 16 | 2 | 18 | alpine skiing, cross-country skiing, floor hockey |
| Uzbekistan | 9 | 10 | 19 | alpine skiing, figure skating, speed skating, snowshoeing |
Latin America
| Argentina | 11 | 5 | 16 | alpine skiing, cross-country skiing, floorball, snowboarding, snowshoeing |
| Chile | 4 | 4 | 8 | alpine skiing, snowboarding |
| Costa Rica | 18 | 2 | 20 | floor hockey, snowshoeing |
| Cuba | 12 | 0 | 12 | floor hockey |
| Dominican Republic | 2 | 2 | 4 | snowshoeing |
| Mexico | 29 | 4 | 33 | floorball, floor hockey, figure skating, speed skating |
| Uruguay | 0 | 9 | 9 | floorball |
| Venezuela | 16 | 6 | 22 | floorball, floor hockey, speed skating, snowshoeing |
MENA
| Algeria | 16 | 0 | 16 | floor hockey |
| Brunei | 2 | 2 | 4 | snowshoeing |
| Egypt | 18 | 2 | 20 | floor hockey, snowshoeing |
| Iran | 11 | 0 | 11 | floor hockey |
| Iraq | 2 | 2 | 4 | snowshoeing |
| Jordan | 4 | 4 | 8 | speed skating, snowshoeing |
| Lebanon | 5 | 4 | 9 | cross-country skiing, snowshoeing |
| Libya | 2 | 0 | 2 | snowshoeing |
| Morocco | 16 | 2 | 18 | floor hockey, snowshoeing |
| Oman | 2 | 2 | 4 | snowshoeing |
| Palestine | 2 | 0 | 2 | snowshoeing |
| Qatar | 5 | 0 | 5 | speed skating, snowshoeing |
| Saudi Arabia | 6 | 0 | 6 | speed skating, snowshoeing |
| Syria | 4 | 2 | 6 | cross-country skiing, speed skating, snowshoeing |
| Tunisia | 16 | 2 | 18 | floor hockey, snowshoeing |
| United Arab Emirates | 20 | 3 | 23 | floor hockey, speed skating, snowshoeing |
North America
| Canada | 68 | 40 | 108 | alpine skiing, cross-country skiing, floor hockey, figure skating, speed skating, snowshoeing |
| Jamaica | 18 | 0 | 18 | floor hockey, speed skating |
| Saint Lucia | 12 | 4 | 16 | floor hockey |
| Trinidad and Tobago | 10 | 6 | 16 | floor hockey |
| United States | 82 | 57 | 139 | alpine skiing, cross-country skiing, floor hockey, figure skating, snowboarding, speed skating, snowshoeing |
| | 1,555 | 722 | 2,277 | |

=== Events ===
The following events took place at Austria 2017:

- Alpine skiing
- Cross-country skiing
- Floorball
- Floor hockey
- Figure skating
- Snowboarding
- Speed skating
- Snowshoeing
- Stick shooting

=== Calendar ===
| OC | Opening ceremony | ● | Event competitions | 1 | Gold medals | EG | Exhibition gala | CC | Closing ceremony |

| March | 18 Sat | 19 Sun | 20 Mon | 21 Tue | 22 Wed | 23 Thu | 24 Fri | 25 Sat | Gold medals |
|---|---|---|---|---|---|---|---|---|---|
| Ceremonies | OC | | | | | | | CC | |
| Alpine skiing | | ● | ● | ● | ● | ● | ● | ● | |
| Cross-country skiing | | ● | ● | ● | ● | ● | ● | ● | |
| Figure skating | | ● | ● | ● | ● | ● | | | |
| Floorball | | ● | ● | | | | | | |
| Floor hockey | | | ● | ● | ● | ● | ● | ● | |
| Short track speed skating | | ● | ● | ● | ● | ● | ● | | |
| Snowboarding | | ● | ● | ● | ● | ● | ● | | |
| Snowshoeing | | ● | ● | ● | ● | ● | ● | ● | |
| March | 18 Sat | 19 Sun | 20 Mon | 21 Tue | 22 Wed | 23 Thu | 24 Fr | 25 Sat | Gold medals |

== Broadcasting ==
The 2017 World Games was broadcast on the following broadcasters in the following country:

- Austria – ORF
- Brazil – ESPN Brasil
- Canada – TSN2, Sportsnet
- New Zealand – Sky Television
- United Kingdom – BBC
- United States – ESPN, ESPN2, ABC
- India – ESPN

| Preceded by Pyeongchang, South Korea | Special Olympics World Winter Games | Succeeded by Kazan, Russia |
