= 1970 Special Olympics World Summer Games =

Multi-sport event held in Chicago, Illinois, US

2nd Special Olympics World Summer Games
- Host city: Chicago, Illinois, United States
- Nations: 3
- Athletes: 2,500
- Events: 190 events in 2 sports
- Opening: August 13, 1970
- Closing: August 15, 1970
- Main venue: Soldier Field

Summer

1970 Special Olympics was the second edition of the Special Olympics World Games held in Soldier Field, Chicago, Illinois, the United States, from August 13 to August 15, 1970. This event was co-sponsored by the Chicago Park District and the Joseph P. Kennedy Jr. Foundation. 2,500 children from 47 states in the United States, Canada, and France participated. One hundred and ninety events of swimming and track and field were contested.

There were 190 events in two sports: track and field and swimming. Track and field events included 50 yard dash, 300 yard run, mile run, high jump, standing long jump, 440 relay, and softball throw. Swimming events included 25 yard and 50 yard free style swimming.
