= 2015 Special Olympics World Summer Games =

Multi-sport event in Los Angeles, California, US

14th Special Olympics World Summer Games
- Host city: Los Angeles, United States
- Motto: Reach Up L.A.
- Nations: 177
- Athletes: 6,500
- Events: in 25 sports
- Opening: July 25, 2015
- Closing: August 2, 2015
- Opened by: Michelle Obama
- Athlete's Oath: Jamaal Charles
- Torch lighter: Rafer Johnson and Destiny Sanchez
- Main venue: Los Angeles Memorial Coliseum
- Website: www.la2015.org

Summer

Winter

The 2015 Special Olympics World Summer Games were a multi-sport event for athletes with intellectual disabilities held in Los Angeles, United States from July 25 to August 2, 2015, in the tradition of the Special Olympics movement.

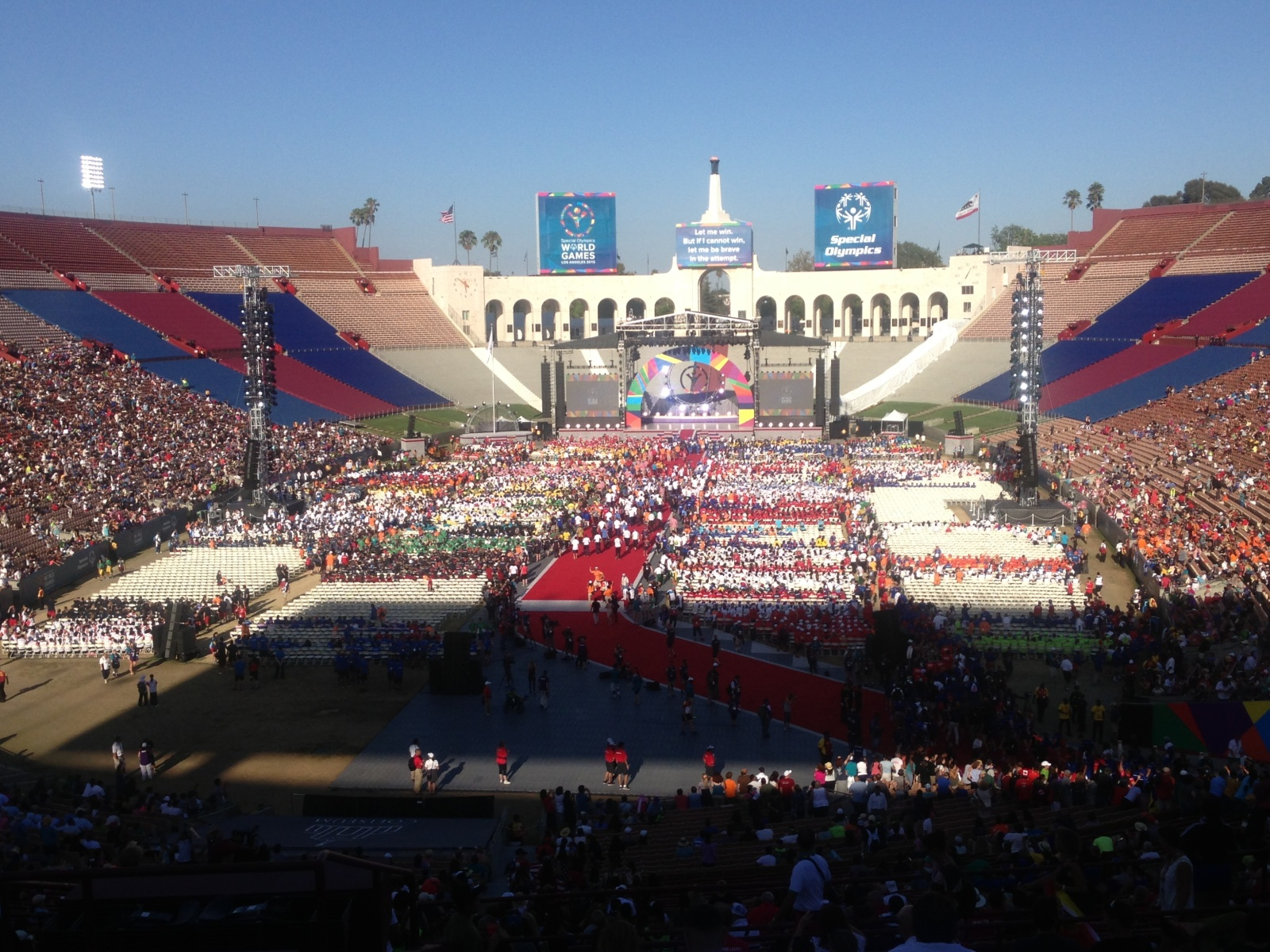
Athletes entering the Los Angeles Memorial Coliseum for closing ceremonies on August 2, 2015.

These Games, hosted around 6,500 athletes from 177 countries, marked the first time in sixteen years that the biennial Special Olympics World Summer Games have been hosted by the United States, and the second hosted by Los Angeles since 1972. The medal tally was led by the United States followed by China and India respectively.

== Background ==
The 2015 Special Olympics World Summer Games were awarded to Los Angeles on September 15, 2011, beating a bid by South Africa. The city's bid was backed by Mayor of Los Angeles Antonio Villaraigosa, who had backed the city's failed bid for the 2016 Summer Olympics (awarded to Rio de Janeiro, Brazil).

Patrick McClenahan, chief of the organizing committee, had encountered representatives of Special Olympics International at the Southern California Law Enforcement Torch Run, a local event benefitting Special Olympics Southern California. The group suggested that Los Angeles bid for the 2015 World Summer Games. The bid quickly garnered support, with his committee having grown to 20 members, including athletes and Mayor Villaraigosa, only two weeks later. Amongst other receptions held during a visit by the selection committee to Los Angeles, a group of Special Olympics athletes participating in the World Summer Games in Athens were honored between quarters at a Los Angeles Lakers basketball game that the committee were attending, resulting in an ovation from fans in attendance.

Villaraigosa felt "prouder" that the city would host the Special Olympics World Summer Games instead of the 2016 Summer Olympics. Of the bid, McClenahan stated that "In a city full of movie stars and sports stars, the athletes are going to be the stars of the show. "L.A. will create the world stage where the athletes can perform, show their skills and courage and determination and sportsmanship and as a result of that people come in contact with them and their perceptions change that leads to an awareness that leads to more inclusion and acceptance into the community."

== The Games ==
=== Venues ===
These Games were primarily held on the campuses of the University of Southern California and University of California, Los Angeles; USC hosted athletics (Cromwell Field and Loker Stadium), aquatics (Uytengsu Aquatics Center), and basketball (Galen Center) events, while UCLA hosted 5-a-side football (Intramural Fields) 11-a-side football (Drake Stadium and the North Athletic Field), badminton, gymnastics, judo, softball, tennis (Los Angeles Tennis Center) and volleyball (Pauley Pavilion). Other venues in Los Angeles were used, such as the Los Angeles Convention Center, Los Angeles Equestrian Center, Lucky Strike Lanes for bowling, the Balboa Sports Center in Encino for 7-a-side football, the Los Angeles Municipal Courses, Griffith Park for golf. The city of Long Beach hosted competition in kayaking, the marathon, volleyball, and demonstration sports.

The use of USC and UCLA was based on their abilities to provide accommodations for the large number of athletes that participated in the Games, as well as their existing sports facilities. To minimize travel time and reduce the Games' impact on local traffic, a centralized athlete's village was not used. Athletes were instead assigned facilities at either UCLA or USC based on the sports they were to participate in.

==== Downtown ====
- Los Angeles Convention Center
  - Halls E & F: Handball
  - South Hall: Badminton, Bocce, Roller Skating, Table Tennis
- Lucky Strike LA Live: Bowling

==== Encino ====
- Balboa Sports Center: Football (Soccer) 7-a-side

==== Griffith Park ====
- Los Angeles Equestrian Center: Equestrian
- Wilson and Harding Golf Course

==== Long Beach ====
- Alamitos Beach: Beach Volleyball and Beach Soccer(opening ceremony), Half Marathon, Open Water Swimming (demonstration), Triathlon (demonstration)
- Belmont Veterans Memorial Pier: Sailing
- Long Beach Marine Stadium: Kayak

==== UCLA ====
- Drake Stadium: Football (Soccer) 11-A-Side 11,700
- Easton Stadium: Softball 1,300 seats
- Intramural Field: Football (Soccer) 5-A-Side
- John Wooden Recreation Center: Gymnastics (Artistic and Rhythmic)
- Los Angeles Tennis Center: Tennis 5,800 seats
- North Athletic Field: Football (Soccer) 11-a-side
- Pauley Pavilion: Volleyball 13,800 seats
- Student Activities Center: Judo

==== USC ====
- Galen Center: Basketball 10,258 seats
- Loker Stadium/ Cromwell Field: Athletics 1,900 seats
- Uytengsu Aquatics Center: Aquatics: 1,640

=== Sports ===
- Aquatics
- Athletics
- Badminton
- Basketball
- Bocce
- Bowling
- Cricket
- Cycling
- Equestrian
- Football (soccer)
- Golf
- Gymnastics
- Handball
- Judo
- Kayaking
- Powerlifting
- Roller skating
- Sailing
- Softball
- Table tennis
- Tennis
- Volleyball

Demonstration events in beach soccer, beach volleyball, open water swimming, and triathlon were also held.

=== Participating nations ===
Delegations to the 2015 Special Olympics World Summer Games
- Afghanistan
- Albania
- Algeria
- American Samoa
- Argentina
- Armenia
- Aruba
- Australia
- Austria
- Azerbaijan
- Bahamas
- Bahrain
- Bangladesh
- Barbados
- Belarus
- Belgium
- Belize
- Benin
- Bhutan
- Bolivia
- Bonaire
- Bosnia and Herzegovina
- Botswana
- Brazil
- Brunei
- Bulgaria
- Burkina Faso
- Cambodia
- Canada
- Cayman Islands
- Chile
- China
- Chinese Taipei
- Colombia
- Costa Rica
- Croatia
- Cuba
- Curacao
- Cyprus
- Czech Republic
- Democratic Republic of Congo
- Denmark
- Dominica
- Dominican Republic
- Ecuador
- Egypt
- El Salvador
- Estonia
- Faroe Islands
- Fiji
- Finland
- France
- Georgia
- Germany
- Ghana
- Gibraltar
- Great Britain
- Greece
- Guatemala
- Guyana
- Honduras
- Hong Kong
- Hungary
- Haiti
- Iceland
- India
- Indonesia
- Iran
- Iraq
- Ireland
- Isle of Man
- Israel
- Italy
- Ivory Coast
- Jamaica
- Japan
- Jordan
- Kazakhstan
- Kenya
- South Korea
- Kosovo
- Kyrgyzstan
- Laos
- Latvia
- Lebanon
- Libya
- Liechtenstein
- Lithuania
- Luxembourg
- Macau
- Macedonia
- Malawi
- Malaysia
- Mali
- Malta
- Mauritius
- Mexico
- Moldova
- Monaco
- Mongolia
- Montenegro
- Morocco
- Myanmar
- Namibia
- Nepal
- Netherlands
- New Zealand
- Nicaragua
- Nigeria
- Norway
- Pakistan
- Palestine
- Panama
- Papua New Guinea
- Paraguay
- Peru
- Philippines
- Poland
- Portugal
- Puerto Rico
- Qatar
- Romania
- Russia
- Rwanda
- Samoa
- San Marino
- Saudi Arabia
- Senegal
- Serbia
- Seychelles
- Singapore
- Slovakia
- Slovenia
- South Africa
- Spain
- Sri Lanka
- St. Kitts and Nevis
- St. Lucia
- St. Vincent and the Grenadines
- Suriname
- Swaziland
- Sweden
- Switzerland
- Syria
- Tajikistan
- Tanzania
- Thailand
- Timor Leste
- Togo
- Tonga
- Trinidad and Tobago
- Tunisia
- Turkey
- Turkmenistan
- Uganda
- Ukraine
- United Arab Emirates
- United States (host)
- Uruguay
- US Virgin Islands
- Uzbekistan
- Venezuela
- Vietnam
- Zambia
- Zimbabwe

=== Ceremonies ===
The opening ceremony of the Games were held on July 25, 2015, at Los Angeles Memorial Coliseum. The ceremony featured performances by J Balvin, Becky G, Cassadee Pope, Cody Simpson, Mix Master Mike, O.A.R., Siedah Garrett, Stevie Wonder, and Avril Lavigne. Pussycat Dolls lead singer and Special Olympics ambassador Nicole Scherzinger sang the American national anthem. A pre-recorded message by President Barack Obama was played, while First Lady Michelle Obama gave a speech in-person. The Flame of Hope was used by Special Olympian Destiny Sanchez, joined by Rafer Johnson, to light the stadium's Olympic cauldron (as Johnson had done in 1984).

The closing ceremony of the Games were held on August 2, 2015. The ceremony featured performances by Andra Day, Carly Rae Jepsen, and O.A.R..

Preceded by Athens, Greece	Special Olympics World Summer Games	Succeeded by Abu Dhabi, United Arab Emirates
