= Special Olympics World Games =

Major international sport event for people with intellectual disabilities

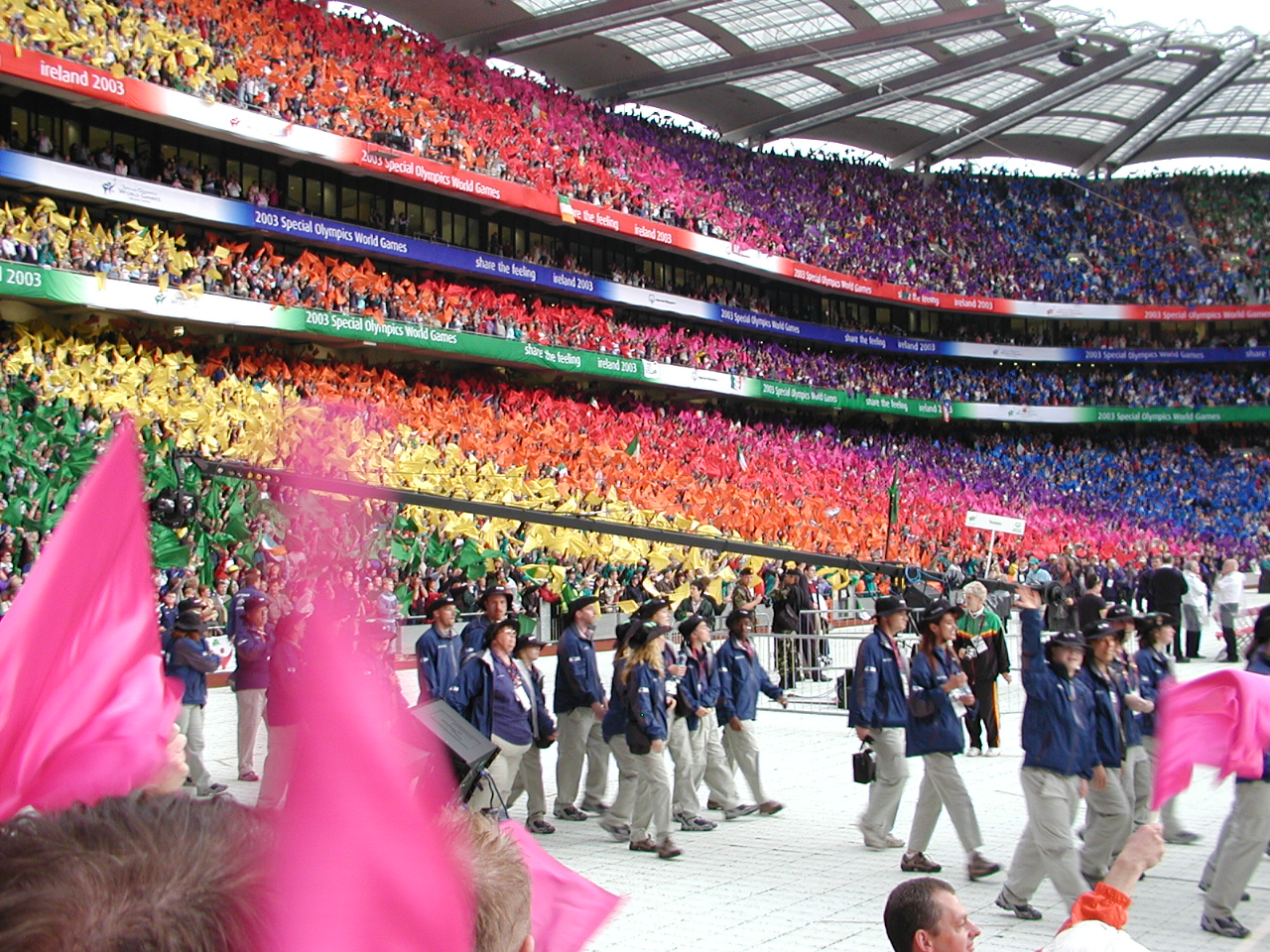
- The crowd at the Special Olympics World Games Opening Ceremony in Croke Park, Dublin, Ireland, 2003
- Status: Active
- Genre: Sporting event
- Date: Various
- Frequency: Every two years
- Country: Various
- Inaugurated: 1968 (summer); 1977 (winter)

The Special Olympics World Games, also known as Special Olympiad, are an international sporting event for participants with intellectual disabilities, organised by the IOC-recognised Special Olympics organisation.

== Principles ==
Children competing in the 2011 Special Olympics World Games

Although local Special Olympics events and competitions are held around the world every day, the World Games are flagship events. The goal is to showcase the skills and accomplishments of people with intellectual disabilities on a global stage. The World Games feature more than a week of competitions involving thousands of participants. Through media coverage of the Games, the stories and achievements of children and adults with intellectual disabilities are made known to millions of people worldwide.

Special Olympics World Games take place every two years and alternate between Summer and Winter Games, a schedule similar to the Olympics and Paralympics. Attracting as many as 350,000 volunteers and coaches, plus several thousands of athletes, these World Games can be the world's largest sporting event of the year.

Special Olympics athletes can compete in 32 Olympic-style summer or winter sports. The athletes are adults and children with intellectual disabilities who can range from gifted, world-class competitors to average athletes to those with limited physical ability. In Special Olympics competitions, athletes are matched up according to their ability and age. This “divisioning” process is an effort to make every competition fair, competitive and exciting for athletes as well as fans.

== History ==
The first International Special Olympics Summer Games were held in Chicago, Illinois, US, in 1968, while the first International Special Olympics Winter Games were held in February 1977 in Steamboat Springs, Colorado, US. In 1991, the name was officially changed from International Special Olympics Summer/Winter Games to Special Olympics World Summer/Winter Games.

The 1999 Special Olympics World Summer Games received more than half of its funding from private corporations. Olympic historian Bob Barney stated "companies that donate millions might want say in how an event is run", but also felt it positive since "it brings the games to a much larger viewing audience".

In 2011, Special Olympics World Summer Games were held on June 25 – July 4 in Athens, Greece, involving 6,000 athletes with intellectual disabilities from 170 countries.

In 2013, the Special Olympics World Winter Games were held in PyeongChang, South Korea, from Jan. 29 – Feb. 5. The Host Town program, in which families host Special Olympics athletes from around the world to help them acclimate to the host country and customs, began on Jan. 26, 2013.

In 2015 Special Olympics World Summer Games . These games were the first Special Olympics World Summer Games held in the United States in 16 years since the 1999 Summer Games held in Raleigh, North Carolina.

In 2017 Special Olympics World Winter Games in Graz and Schladming in Styria, Austria. This marked a return: Salzburg and Schladming, Austria hosted the fifth Special Olympics World Winter Games in 1993. These were the first Special Olympics World Games held outside the United States. The 2017 World Winter Games were held on March 14–25, 2017.

Kazan, Russia, was due to host the Winter Special Olympics between January 23–29, 2023. Originally to be held in Åre and Östersund, Sweden, however the Swedish Government withdrew its hosting rights in December 2019 due to financial problems. The event had been postponed to January 2023 due a rise of COVID-19 cases. Following Russia's invasion of Ukraine, the event was cancelled due to logistical and safety issues.

The 2023 Special Olympics World Summer Games were held June 17–25, 2023 in Berlin, Germany. These were the first Special Olympics World Games to be held in Germany. Competitions were held in 24 sports.

Turin, Italy, held the World Winter Games in March 2025. It marked the first time that Italy has hosted the Special Olympics World Games.

Santiago, Chile, will host the next World Summer Games in 2027. It will mark the first time the Special Olympics World Games will be staged in the Southern Hemisphere. It will also be the first time it will be held in Latin America and a Spanish speaking country.

== Editions ==
=== Special Olympics World Summer Games ===
Special Olympics World Summer Games
Edition	Year	Host City	Host country	Sports	Nations
1968	1	Chicago	United States	3	2
1970	2	Chicago	United States	2	3
1972	3	Los Angeles	United States	2	8
1975	4	Mount Pleasant	United States	5	10
1979	5	Brockport	United States	8	50
1983	6	Baton Rouge	United States	13	50
1987	7	Indiana	United States	14	72
1991	8	Minnesota	United States	16	91
1995	9	New Haven	United States	21	143
1999	10	North Carolina	United States	19	150
2003	11	Dublin	Ireland (Note: The Special Olympics national program encompasses the entire island of Ireland and some events were held in Belfast)	23	166
2007	12	Shanghai	China	25	165
2011	13	Athens	Greece (Note: The national Special Olympics program is officially known as Hellas)	22	185
2015	14	Los Angeles	United States	25	177
2019	15	Abu Dhabi	United Arab Emirates	22	190
2023	16	Berlin	Germany	24	190
2027	17	Santiago	Chile	22	170

=== Special Olympics World Winter Games ===
Special Olympics World Winter Games
Edition	Year	Host City	Host country	Sports	National Programs
1977	1	Steamboat Springs	United States	3	1
1981	2	Vermont	United States	3	1
1985	3	Park City	United States	3	12
1989	4	Reno, Lake Tahoe and Squaw Valley	United States	5	18
1993	5	Salzburg and Schladming	Austria	5	50
1997	6	Toronto	Canada	7	73
2001	7	Anchorage	United States	7	80
2005	8	Nagano	Japan (Note: The national Special Olympics program is officially known as Nippon)	7	84
2009	9	Boise	United States	7	85
2013	10	PyeongChang	South Korea	7	100
2017	11	Graz and Schladming	Austria	9	107
2025	12	Turin	Italy	8	93
2029	13	Chur-Graubünden	Switzerland	9	100

^{1} Sarajevo, Bosnia and Herzegovina, was originally selected to host the 2009 Special Olympics World Winter Games. Due to financial problems and the constant delay in reconstruction of the venues that originally hosted the 1984 Winter Olympics, Sarajevo gave up hosting the Special Olympics and Boise, Idaho, was invited to host instead.

^{2} It was planned that Åre and Östersund, Sweden, would host the 2021 World Winter Games between February 2 to 13, 2021. However, on December 20, 2019, it was announced that the Swedish Paralympic Committee vetoed the necessary financing for the continuity of the event in the country, invalidating a promise made during the bid process. On June 29, 2020, it was announced that Kazan would host the Winter Games in 2022.

- The sport of powerlifting (Special Olympics) was represented for the first time in 1983.
- Table tennis, tennis, and football have been Special Olympics sports since 1987.

== Sports ==
=== Official summer sports ===
See footnote

- Athletics (track and field)
- Badminton
- Basketball
- Bocce
- Bowling
- Cycling
- Equestrian
- Football (Soccer)
- Golf
- Gymnastics — artistic and rhythmic
- Handball
- Judo
- Powerlifting
- Roller skating
- Sailing
- Softball
- Swimming
- Table tennis
- Tennis
- Volleyball

=== Official winter sports ===
See footnote

- Alpine skiing
- Cross-country skiing
- Figure skating
- Floorball
- Floor hockey
- Short track speed skating
- Snowboarding
- Snowshoeing
- Speedskating

=== Recognised sports ===
- Cricket
- Kayaking

=== Demonstration sports ===
- Stick Shooting

=== Unified Cup (association football) ===
Unified Cup

- 2018 Unified Cup, Chicago
- 2022 Unified Cup, Detroit

== Mascots ==
Games	City	Name	Type	Significance	Image	Refs.
2007 Special Olympics World Summer Games	Shanghai	Sunny Sanmao	Boy	Based on the manhua character created by Zhang Leping		
2011 Special Olympics World Summer Games	Athens	Apollon	Sun	Named after the god Apollo		
2013 Special Olympics World Winter Games	Pyeongchang	Ra, In, and Bow	Bear, sheep, and dog	Their names spell "Rainbow"		
2017 Special Olympics World Winter Games	Graz and Schladming	Lara and Luis	Deer and badger	Animals from Austria		
2019 Special Olympics World Summer Games	Abu Dhabi	Faris and Rabdan	Boy and horse	Horses are a symbol of Arabia and are used therapeutically		
2022 Special Olympics World Winter Games (cancelled)	Kazan	Zilant	Dragon	Mythical creature from Turkic mythology		
2023 Special Olympics World Summer Games	Berlin	Unity	Heart	It represents unity and affection		

== Regional games ==
=== Zones ===
204 National Programs in 7 Continental Zones (Updated at December 17, 2022):

Number	Region	National Programs
1	Africa	40
2	Asia-Pacific	35
3	East Asia	6
4	Eurasia	58
5	Latin America	20
6	MENA	22
7	North America	23
Total	Special Olympics	204

=== Asia Pacific Games ===
In 2013, Australia hosted the first ever Special Olympics Asia Pacific Games.

- 2013 (Australia) Newcastle
- 2025 (Japan) Utsunomiya
- 2029 (China) Tianjin

=== Special Olympics European Games ===
- 1990 (United Kingdom) Strathclyde
- 2000 (Netherlands) Groningen
- 2014 (Belgium) Antwerp

=== USA Games ===
USA Games

=== Middle East and North Africa Games ===
MENA games

==== Games ====
- 1999 Egypt
- 2000 (Morocco) Rabat
- 2002 (Lebanon) Beirut
- 2004 (Tunisia) Tunis
- 2006 (United Arab Emirates) Dubai
- 2008 (United Arab Emirates) Abu-Dhabi
- 2010 (Syria) Damascus
- 2014 (Egypt) Cairo
- 2018 United Arab Emirates

==== Equestrian Competitions ====
- 2025 United Arab Emirates

=== Pan African Games ===
First ever Pan African Games in 2020 in Cairo, Egypt.

- 2020 (Egypt) Cairo
- Next:

=== Latin American Games ===
Latin American Special Olympics Games:

4th Latin American Special Olympics - Asunción, Paraguay 2024

== See also ==
- Ancient Olympic Games
- Paralympics
- Deaflympics
- Flame of Hope (Special Olympics)
- Camp Shriver
- Special Olympics USA National Games
