= 2003 Special Olympics World Summer Games =

Multi-sport event in Dublin, Ireland

11th Special Olympics World Summer Games
- Host city: Dublin, Ireland
- Motto: Share the Feeling
- Nations: 166
- Events: 23 sports
- Opening: 21 June 2003
- Closing: 29 June 2003
- Opened by: Mary McAleese and Nelson Mandela
- Main venue: Croke Park

Summer

Winter

The 2003 Special Olympics World Summer Games were hosted in Dublin, Ireland, with participants staying in various host towns around the island of Ireland (Northern Ireland and Republic of Ireland) in the lead up to the games before moving to Dublin for the events. Events were held from 21 to 29 June 2003 at many venues including Morton Stadium, the Royal Dublin Society, the National Basketball Arena, all in Dublin. Croke Park served as the central stadium for the opening and closing ceremonies, even though no actual competitions took place there. Belfast, Northern Ireland was the venue for roller skating events (at the Kings Hall), as well as the Special Olympics Scientific Symposium (held from 19 to 20 June).

== The Games ==
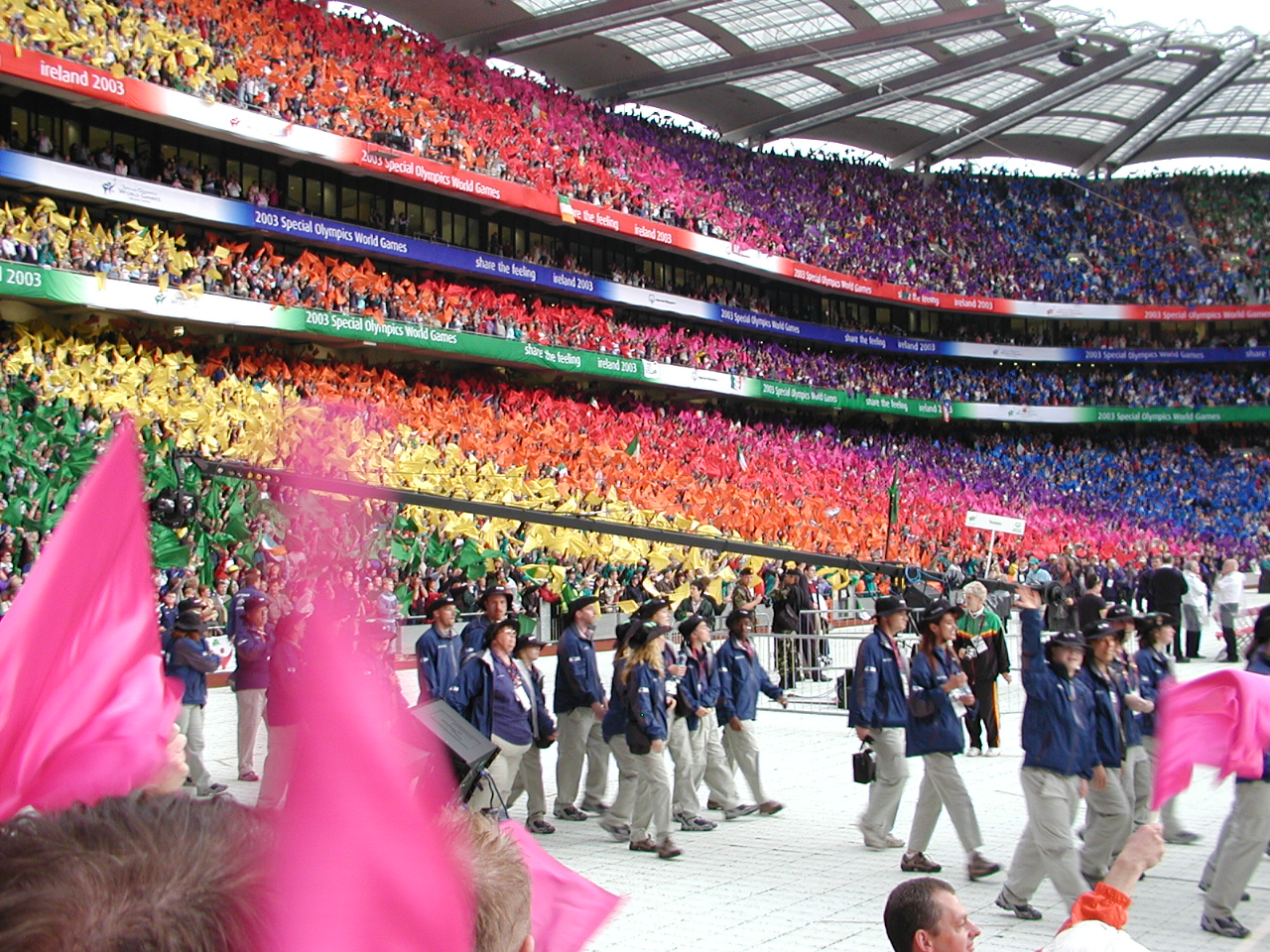
The crowd at the 2003 Special Olympics World Games Opening Ceremonies in Croke Park, Dublin, Ireland as Team USA enters the stadium

The 2003 World Games were the first to be held outside of the United States. This was the largest sporting event held in 2003.

=== Opening ceremony ===
The opening ceremony was held in Croke Park and featured an array of stars and was hosted by comedian Patrick Kielty. The band U2 were a major feature, and Nelson Mandela officially opened the games. Other performances included The Corrs and the largest Riverdance troupe ever assembled on one stage. 75,000 athletes and spectators were in attendance at the opening ceremonies. Irish and international celebrities such as Arnold Schwarzenegger and Jon Bon Jovi walked with the athletes, with Muhammad Ali as a special guest and Manchester United and Republic of Ireland football player Roy Keane taking the athletes oath with one of the Special Olympians.

The Games Flame was lit at the culmination of the Law Enforcement Torch Run, which more than 2,000 members of the Garda Síochána (Irish Police) and the Police Service of Northern Ireland took part in. This was a series of relays carrying the Special Olympics Torch, the "Flame of Hope", from Europe to the Games' official opening.

2003 Special Olympics commemorative coin issued by the Central Bank of Ireland

The ceremony was officially opened by President of Ireland Mary McAleese and attended by Taoiseach (Prime Minister of Ireland) Bertie Ahern.

=== Organisation ===
The organising committee, which was formed in 1999 following the success of the bid, was chaired by entrepreneur Denis O'Brien. The chief executive was Mary Davis.

The 2003 games were the first to have their opening and closing schemes broadcast on live television, and Radio Telefís Éireann provided extensive coverage of the events through their 'Voice of the Games' radio station which replaced RTÉ Radio 1 on Medium Wave for the duration of the event. There was also a nightly television highlight programme.

Among the activities carried out during the Games were thorough medical checks on the athletes, some of whom had previously undiagnosed conditions uncovered, as some of the athletes came from countries with limited medical facilities or had difficulty communicating their symptoms.

A daily newspaper, the Games Gazette was published for each day of the games.

Among the contributors to the Games was the Irish Prison Service. Prisoners in Mountjoy Prison, Midlands Prison, Wheatfield Prison and Arbour Hill Prison who constructed podiums and made flags, towels, signs, benches and other equipment.

=== Volunteer programme ===
30,000 volunteer officials and support staff assisted in the running of the games, including 900 staff of the Bank of Ireland who coordinated the host town programme, and 800 members of the Irish Defence Forces who maintained the radio communication network, and provided support for bridge building, security duties, VIP drivers, standard bearers for ceremonial events. The Irish Red Cross, Order of Malta and St. John Ambulance Brigade of Ireland provided emergency medical teams at the event sites. Approximately 1,300 members of both Scouting Ireland (CSI) and Scouting Ireland SAI staffed the Awards Teams for all the disciplines throughout the games. 165 volunteers from the 15 countries of the EU took part in a European Volunteer Project (EVS), the first ever to be organized in event-related mode. The volunteers are commemorated by having their names on a series of plaques situated in Dublin Castle, just outside the Chester Beatty Library.

== Participating teams ==
Approximately 6500 athletes from 166 countries competed in the games in 18 official disciplines, and three exhibition sports. The participants from Kosovo were the region's first team at an international sporting event.- A 12-member team from Iraq received special permission to attend the games, despite ongoing war in their home nation. Ireland was represented by an all-island team with athletes from both the Republic of Ireland and Northern Ireland. Athletes from Taiwan competed under the name "Chinese Taipei". Athletes from the United States were grouped into eight regional teams; Great Lakes, Mid Atlantic, New England, North Central, North West, South Central, South East, South West.

Ireland's Department of Health has initially barred athletes from areas affected by the 2002–2004 SARS outbreak. This affected athletes from parts of China, Hong Kong, Philippines, Singapore and Taiwan; as well as Toronto in Canada. However no country was ultimately banned from participating with Hong Kong and Taiwan's athletes undergoing quarantine.

The following teams participated, grouped by Special Olympics regions:

Africa

- Benin
- Botswana
- Burkina Faso
- Cameroon
- Central African Republic
- Chad
- Cote D'Ivoire
- Democratic Republic of Congo
- Gabon
- Gambia
- Ghana
- Guinea
- Kenya
- Lesotho
- Malawi
- Mali
- Mauritius
- Namibia
- Niger
- Nigeria
- Réunion
- Rwanda
- Senegal
- Seychelles
- Sierra Leone
- South Africa
- Swaziland
- Tanzania
- Togo
- Uganda
- Zambia
- Zimbabwe

Asia Pacific

- Afghanistan
- American Samoa
- Australia
- Bangladesh
- Guam
- India (Bharat)
- Indonesia
- Japan (Nippon)
- Malaysia
- Nepal (Nepa)
- New Zealand
- Pakistan
- Philippines (Pilipinas)
- Singapore
- Thailand

East Asia

- China
- Chinese Taipei
- Hong Kong
- Macau
- South Korea (Korea)

Europe and Eurasia

- Andorra
- Armenia
- Austria
- Azerbaijan
- Belarus
- Belgium
- Bosnia and Herzegovina
- Bulgaria
- Croatia
- Cyprus
- Czech Republic
- Denmark
- Estonia
- Faroe Islands
- Finland
- France
- Georgia
- Germany
- Gibraltar
- (United Kingdom) Great Britain
- Greece (Hellas)
- Hungary
- Iceland
- Ireland (Host)
- Isle of Man
- Israel
- Italy
- Kazakhstan
- Kosovo
- Kyrgyzstan
- Latvia
- Liechtenstein
- Lithuania
- Luxembourg
- (North Macedonia) FYR Macedonia
- Malta
- Moldova
- Monaco
- Netherlands
- Norway
- Poland
- Portugal
- Romania
- Russia
- San Marino
- Serbia and Montenegro
- Slovakia
- Slovenia
- Spain
- Sweden
- Switzerland
- Tajikistan
- Turkey (Türkiye)
- Turkmenistan
- Ukraine
- Uzbekistan

Latin America

- Bolivia
- Brazil
- Chile
- Costa Rica
- Cuba
- Dominican Republic
- Ecuador
- El Salvador
- Guatemala
- Honduras
- Panama
- Paraguay
- Peru
- Puerto Rico
- Uruguay
- Venezuela

Middle East and North Africa

- Algeria
- Bahrain
- Egypt
- Iran
- Iraq
- Jordan
- Kuwait
- Lebanon
- Libya
- Mauritania
- Morocco
- Oman
- Palestine
- Qatar
- Saudi Arabia
- Sudan
- Syria
- Tunisia
- United Arab Emirates
- Yemen

North America

- Aruba
- Bahamas
- Barbados
- Bermuda
- Bonaire
- Canada
- Cayman Islands
- Curacao
- Guadeloupe
- Guyana
- Jamaica
- Martinique
- Mexico
- St. Kitts and Nevis
- Saint Lucia
- St. Vincent and the Grenadines
- Suriname
- Trinidad and Tobago
- United States
- US Virgin Islands

=== Host town programme ===
177 towns, cities and villages and the Aran Islands hosted national delegations in the run up to the games. Each town ran programmes to educate the local community about the customs of the country they would host and provided facilities for the teams to acclimatise. Newbridge, County Kildare, host to the Japan delegation won the award for best host town.

No	Visiting Country	Host Town(s)	County of Host Town(s)
1	Albania	Loughrea	Galway
2	Algeria	Ballinrobe and Clonbur	Mayo and Galway
3	American Samoa	Dunlavin	Wicklow
4	Andora	Antrim Borough	Antrim
5	Antigua and Barbuda	Bangor	Down
6	Argentina	Derry	Londonderry
7	Armenia	Ennistymon	Clare
8	Aruba	Mallow	Cork
9	Australia	Armagh	Armagh
10	Austria	Limerick	Limerick
11	Azerbaijan	Shannon	Clare
12	The Bahamas	Dungarvan	Waterford
13	Bahrain	Rathdrum	Wicklow
14	Bangladesh	Ashbourne	Meath
15	Barbados	Portarlington	Laois
16	Belarus	Bandon	Cork
17	Belgium	Navan	Meath
18	Benin	Tubbercurry	Sligo
19	Bermuda	Lisburn	Antrim/Down
20	Bolivia	Tullow	Carlow
21	Bonaire	Gorey	Wexford
22	Bosnia and Herzegovina	Carrick-on-Shannon	Leitrim
23	Botswana	Trim	Meath
24	Brazil	Maynooth	Kildare
25	Bulgaria	Monasterevin	Kildare
26	Burkina Faso	Bunclody	Wexford
27	Cameroon	An Spidéal	Galway
28	Canada	Enniscorthy	Wexford
29	Cayman Islands	Strabane	Tyrone
30	Chad	Swinford	Mayo
31	Chile	Athy	Kildare
32	China	Bray	Wicklow
33	Chinese Taipei	Portlaoise	Laois
34	Congo	Mohill	Leitrim
35	Costa Rica	Drogheda	Louth
36	Côte d'Ivoire	Callan	Kilkenny
37	Croatia	Greystones	Wicklow
38	Cuba	Cashel	Tipperary
39	Cyprus	Tipperary	Tipperary
40	Czech Republic	Skibbereen	Cork
41	Denmark	Clonakilty	Cork
42	Dominican Republic	Ballinasloe	Galway
43	Ecuador	Mountbellew	Galway
44	Egypt	Tuam	Galway
45	Estonia	Clifden	Galway
46	Faroe Islands	Carrickfergus	Antrim
47	Finland	Buncrana	Donegal
48	France	Ballina	Mayo
49	Gabon	Mitchelstown	Cork
50	The Gambia	Manorhamilton	Leitrim
51	Georgia	Kilrush	Clare
52	Germany	Kilkenny	Kilkenny
53	Ghana	Cahir	Tipperary
54	Gibraltar	Sligo	Sligo
55	Greece	Dundalk	Louth
56	Guadeloupe	Limavady	Londonderry
57	Guatemala	New Ross	Wexford
58	Guinea	Kilmore Quay	Wexford
59	Guyana	Ardee	Louth
60	Honduras	Banbridge	Down
61	Hong Kong	Clonmel	Tipperary
62	Hungary	Donegal	Donegal
63	Iceland	Newry	Armagh
64	India	Athlone	Roscommon/Westmeath
65	Indonesia	Abbeyleix	Laois
66	Iran	Macroom	Cork
67	Ireland	Celbridge, Kilcock, Leixlip and Lucan	Kildare and Dublin
68	Isle of Man	Rathangan	Kildare
69	Israel	Ballymena	Antrim
70	Italy	Killarney	Kerry
71	Jamaica	Waterford	Waterford
72	Japan	Newbridge	Kildare
73	Jordan	Listowel and Tarbert	Kerry
74	Kazakhstan	Milltown Malbay	Clare
75	Kenya	Kilcullen	Kildare
76	South Korea	Borrisokane	Tipperary
77	Kosovo	Edenderry	Offaly
78	Kuwait	Castlerea	Roscommon
79	Kyrgyzstan	Pallasgreen	Limerick
80	Latvia	Kells	Meath
81	Lebanon	Mullingar	Westmeath
82	Lesotho	Cahersiveen	Kerry
83	Libya	Templemore	Tipperary
84	Liechtenstein	Carrigaline and Crosshaven	Cork
85	Lithuania	Clones	Monaghan
86	Luxembourg	Newport and Westport	Mayo
87	Macau	Ballybofey and Stranorlar	Donegal
88	F.Y.R. of Macedonia	Oldcastle	Meath
89	Malaysia	Banagher	Offaly
90	Mali	Kanturk	Cork
91	Malta	Thurles	Tipperary
92	Martinique	Newcastle West and Rathkeale	Limerick
93	Mauritania	Drumshanbo	Leitrim
94	Mauritius	Boyle	Roscommon
95	Mexico	Cork and Blarney	Cork
96	Moldova	Castleisland	Kerry
97	Monaco	Carrickmacross	Monaghan
98	Morocco	Tullamore	Offaly
99	Namibia	Cookstown	Tyrone
100	Nepal	Virginia	Cavan
101	The Netherlands	Enniskillen	Fermanagh
102	New Zealand	Naas	Kildare
103	Nigeria	Killybegs	Donegal
104	Norway	Magherafelt	Londonderry
105	Oman	Youghal	Cork
106	Pakistan	Balbriggan	Dublin
107	Palestine	Kinsale	Cork
108	Panama	Newtownabbey	Antrim
109	Paraguay	Coleraine	Londonderry
110	Peru	Mountmellick	Laois
111	The Philippines	Tramore	Waterford
112	Poland	Wexford	Wexford
113	Portugal	Aran Islands	Galway
114	Puerto Rico	Kiltimagh	Mayo
115	Qatar	Ballaghaderreen	Roscommon
116	Réunion	Portumna	Galway
117	Romania	Midleton	Cork
118	Russia	Ennis and Ballyea	Clare
119	San Marino	Fermoy	Cork
120	Saudi Arabia	Roscrea	Tipperary
121	Senegal	Ballygar	Galway
122	Seychelles	Baltinglass	Wicklow
123	Sierra Leone	Castleblaney	Monaghan
124	Singapore	Arklow	Wicklow
125	Slovakia	Carrick-on-Suir, Rathgormack and Clonea-Power	Tipperary and Waterford
126	Slovenia	Carlow	Carlow
127	South Africa	Dingle	Kerry
128	Spain	Omagh	Tyrone
129	Saint Kitts and Nevis	Nenagh	Tipperary
130	Saint Lucia	Thomastown	Kilkenny
131	Saint Vincent and the Grenadines	Ballymoney	Antrim
132	Sudan	Bagenalstown	Carlow
133	Suriname	Waterville	Kerry
134	Sweden	Newcastle	Down, Dublin or Wicklow (not specified)
135	Switzerland	Kenmare	Kerry
136	Syria	Wicklow	Wicklow
137	Tajikistan	Abbeyfeale	Kerry
138	Tanzania	Claremorris	Mayo
139	Thailand	Carlingford and the Cooley Peninsula	Louth
140	Togo	Athboy	Meath
141	Trinidad and Tobago	Letterkenny	Donegal
142	Tunisia	Monaghan and Ballybay	Monaghan
143	Turkey	Cavan	Cavan
144	Turkmenistan	Bruff	Limerick
145	Uganda	Roscommon	Roscommon
146	Ukraine	Lisdoonvarna and Doolin	Clare
147	United Arab Emirates	Longford	Longford
148	United States	Belfast	Antrim/Down
149	Uruguay	Dungloe	Donegal
150	Uzbekistan	Kilkee	Clare
151	Venezuela	Castlebar	Mayo
152	Virgin Islands	Newtownards	Down
153	Yemen	Charleville	Cork
154	F.R. of Yugoslavia	Gort	Galway
155	Zambia	Cootehill	Cavan
156	Zimbabwe	Craigavon	Armagh

== Events ==
Athletes and coaches such as Lleyton Hewitt and his coach Roger Rasheed (tennis); Seve Ballesteros, Sandy Lyle and Andrew Marshall (golf), Mick O'Dwyer (Gaelic football) and Brian Kerr (soccer) met and encouraged athletes at events during the games.

Events and venues were:

- Aquatics — National Aquatic Centre, Blanchardstown
- Athletics (track and field) — Morton Stadium, Santry
- Badminton — Badminton Centre, Baldoyle
- Basketball — National Basketball Arena, Tallaght; University College Dublin (UCD), Belfield
- Bocce — Royal Dublin Society (RDS), Ballsbridge
- Bowling — Leisureplex, Blanchardstown
- Cycling — Phoenix Park
- Equestrian — Kill Equestrian Centre, Kill, County Kildare
- Football (soccer) — Athletic Union League Clonshaugh; UCD
- Golf — Portmarnock GC; Elm Green GC, Dunsink
- Gymnastics (artistic and rhythmic) — RDS
- Judo — Sportslink, Santry
- Kayaking — Salmon Leap Canoe Club, Leixlip
- Motor Activity Training Program — RDS
- Pitch and putt — Glenville Pitch & Putt, Old Bawn
- Powerlifting — RDS
- Roller skating — King's Hall, Belfast
- Sailing — Royal St. George Yacht Club, Dún Laoghaire
- Table tennis — RDS
- Team handball — National Show Centre, Cloghran
- Tennis — David Lloyd Riverview, Clonskeagh
- Volleyball — ALSAA, Dublin Airport; Dublin City University, Glasnevin

Preceded by North Carolina, United States	Special Olympics World Summer Games	Succeeded by Shanghai, China
