= 2025 Special Olympics World Winter Games =

International multi-sport event

12th Special Olympics World Winter Games XII Giochi Mondiali Invernali Special Olympics
- Host city: Turin, Italy
- Motto: The Future is Here (Italian: Il futuro è qui)
- Nations: 101 (expected)
- Athletes: 1,500 (expected)
- Events: 8 sports
- Opening: 8 March 2025
- Closing: 15 March 2025
- Main venue: Inalpi Arena (opening); Via Lattea (closing)
- Website: www.turin2025.org

Summer

Winter

The 2025 Special Olympics World Winter Games, officially known as the XII Special Olympics World Winter Games. and commonly known as Turin 2025 (Italian: XII Giochi Mondiali Invernali Special Olympics), were an international multi-sport event. It was the 12th Special Olympics World Winter Games. They took place in Turin, Piedmont, Italy, from 8 to 15 March 2025. This marked the first time that Italy hosted the Special Olympics World Games.

== Host selection ==
The bid was presented in 2021 by the Government of Italy, the Piedmont Region, the City of Turin, the Italian National Olympic Committee, the Italian Paralympic Committee and Angelo Moratti, president of Special Olympics Italy. The original scheduled dates were between 29 January to 9 February 2025. According to the bidding, the ceremonies were planned to be held at Stadio Olimpico Grande Torino, which had been renovated for the 2006 Winter Olympics and Paralympics. It is expected that there would be around 3,125 athletes, 3,000 volunteers, and 100,000 spectators.

On 16 July 2021, Turin was awarded the World Games by Special Olympics International. At the conclusion of the 2023 Special Olympics World Summer Games in Berlin, it was officially announced that the next Winter Games will take place in Turin from 8 to 16 March 2025.

== Representatives ==
Second lady of the USA Usha Vance led the United States presidential delegation to the games.

== The Games ==
=== Venues ===
The following venues were used:

==== Turin ====
- Inalpi Arena - opening ceremony, floorball
- Palasport Tazzoli - figure skating, short track speed skating

==== Mountains ====
- Melezet, Bardonecchia - snowboarding
- Palazzo delle Feste, Bardonecchia - dancesport
- Pragelato Plan - cross-country skiing
- Via Lattea, Sestriere - closing ceremony, alpine skiing, snowshoeing

=== Sports ===
The following eight sports were held:

- Alpine skiing ()
- Cross-country skiing ()
- Dancesport ()
- Figure skating ()
- Floorball ()
- Short track speed skating ()
- Snowboarding ()
- Snowshoeing ()

=== Calendar ===
All times and dates use Central European Time (UTC+01:00)

| OC | Opening ceremony | ● | Event competitions | 1 | Gold medal events | CC | Closing ceremony |

| March 2025 | March | | | | | | | | Events |
| March 2025 | 8th Sat | 9th Sun | 10th Mon | 11th Tue | 12th Wed | 13th Thu | 14th Fri | 15th Sat | Events |
|---|---|---|---|---|---|---|---|---|---|
| Ceremonies | OC | | | | | | | CC | —N/a |
| Alpine skiing | | | | ● | 27 | 32 | ● | 42 | 101 |
| Cross-country skiing | | | ● | ● | 21 | 30 | 32 | 17 | 100 |
| Dancesport | | | | ● | ● | 12 | 9 | | 21 |
| Figure skating | | | | | 6 | 9 | 5 | | 20 |
| Floorball | | | | ● | ● | ● | 11 | 3 | 14 |
| Short track speed skating | | | | ● | ● | 30 | 30 | | 60 |
| Snowboarding | | | | 16 | 9 | 8 | 3 | | 36 |
| Snowshoeing | | | | ● | ● | 46 | 35 | 22 | 103 |
| Daily medal events | | | | 16 | 63 | 167 | 125 | 84 | 455 |
| Cumulative total | | | | 16 | 79 | 246 | 371 | 455 | 455 |
| March 2025 | 8th Sat | 9th Sun | 10th Mon | 11th Tue | 12th Wed | 13th Thu | 14th Fri | 15th Sat | Total events |
| March 2025 | March | | | | | | | | Total events |

=== Medal table ===
Unlike the Olympic and Paralympic Games, the Special Olympics do not provide an official medal table, since there is supposed to be no competitive pressure among the nations. Apart from the medals and placement ribbons, participants who were disqualified or did not finish their competition were also awarded with participation ribbons in order to promote sportsmanship.

* Host nation (Italy)

Medals won by participating delegations
| Rank | Nation | Gold | Silver | Bronze | Total |
|---|---|---|---|---|---|
| Totals (0 entries) | | 0 | 0 | 0 | 0 |

=== Notable Achievements ===
Gerhard Kirnbauer (Austria), aged 66, made history as the oldest competitor at the Special Olympics World Winter Games Turin 2025, participating in snowshoeing events. Kirnbauer represented Special Olympics Austria in the 100m and 200m races.

== Marketing ==
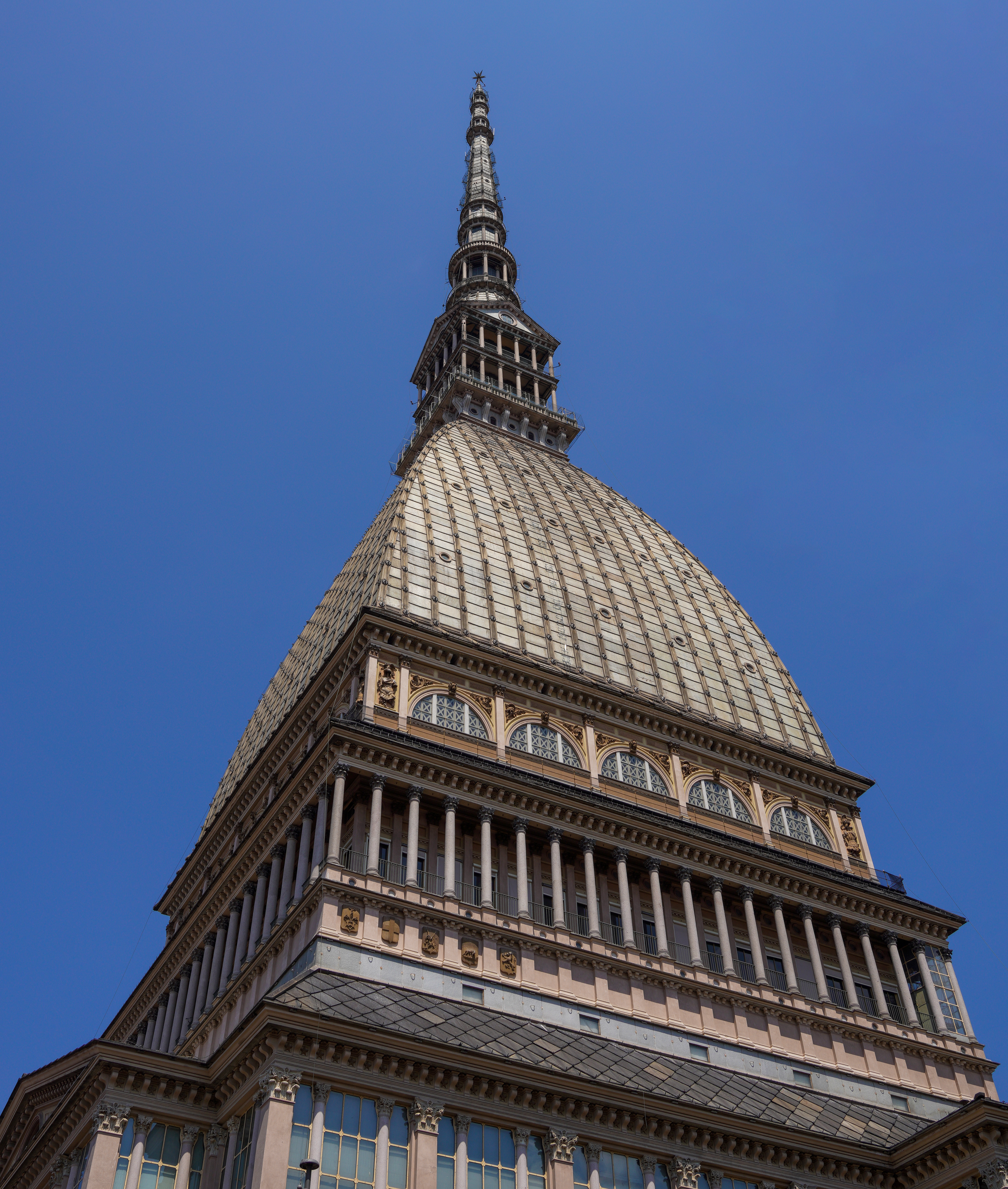
The Mole Antenelliana in Turin is to become part of the World Games logo

The application ran under the slogan The Future is Here.

The following design was chosen for the logo: Turin's landmark, the Mole Antonelliana, and Alps that are stylized, combined with the shape of a snowflake and arranged in a circle around the Special Olympics logo.
