= Flame of Hope (Special Olympics) =

Ceremony at Special Olympics

The Flame of Hope is the symbol of the Special Olympics Games.

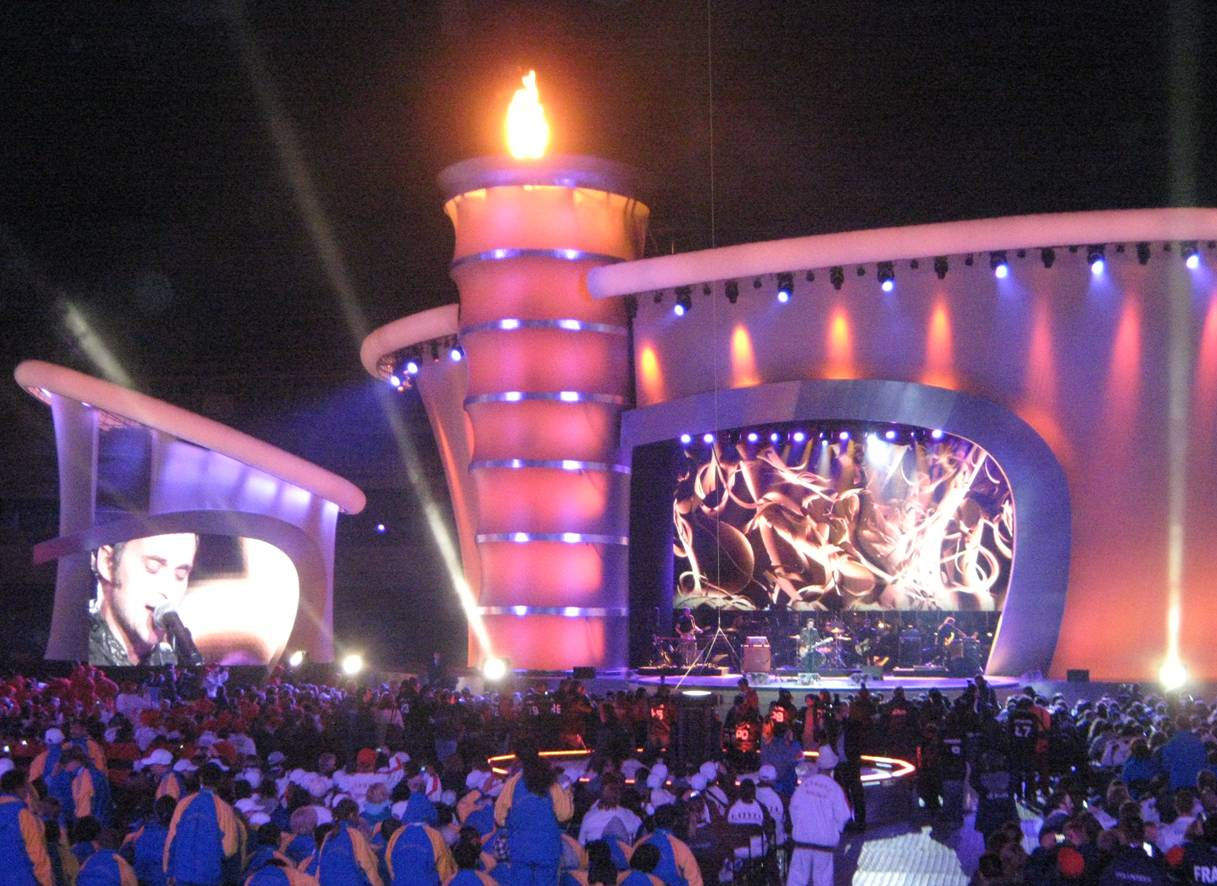
The Flame of Hope during the 2010 Games in Warsaw

It is used much in the same spirit as the Olympic Flame at the Olympic Games, the Flame of Hope is lit during a traditional ceremony in Athens, Greece.

After lighting, the Flame is relayed on foot to the organizing city. This is done by members of law enforcement agencies (mostly police officers) and Special Olympics athletes. This relay, officially the Law Enforcement Torch Run is the flagship of an international fundraising effort.

In 2018, the Flame of Hope was memorialized during the Special Olympics 50th Anniversary when an 30 foot (9.1 m) "Eternal Flame of Hope" monument was erected in honor of the Special Olympics. The sculpture by Richard Hunt stands in a plaza next to Soldier Field, where the first games were held 50 years earlier in 1968.
