= 2007 Special Olympics World Summer Games =

Multi-sport event in Shanghai, China

12th Special Olympics World Summer Games 第十二届世界夏季特殊奥林匹克运动会 Dì shí'èr jiè shìjiè xiàjì tèshū àolínpǐkè yùndònghuì
- Host city: Shanghai, China
- Motto: I Know I Can (Chinese: 我知道我可以)
- Nations: 165
- Athletes: 7291
- Events: 25 sports
- Opening: October 2
- Closing: October 11
- Opened by: Hu Jintao
- Athlete's Oath: Yao Ming
- Torch lighter: Liu Xiang
- Main venue: Shanghai Stadium

Summer

Winter

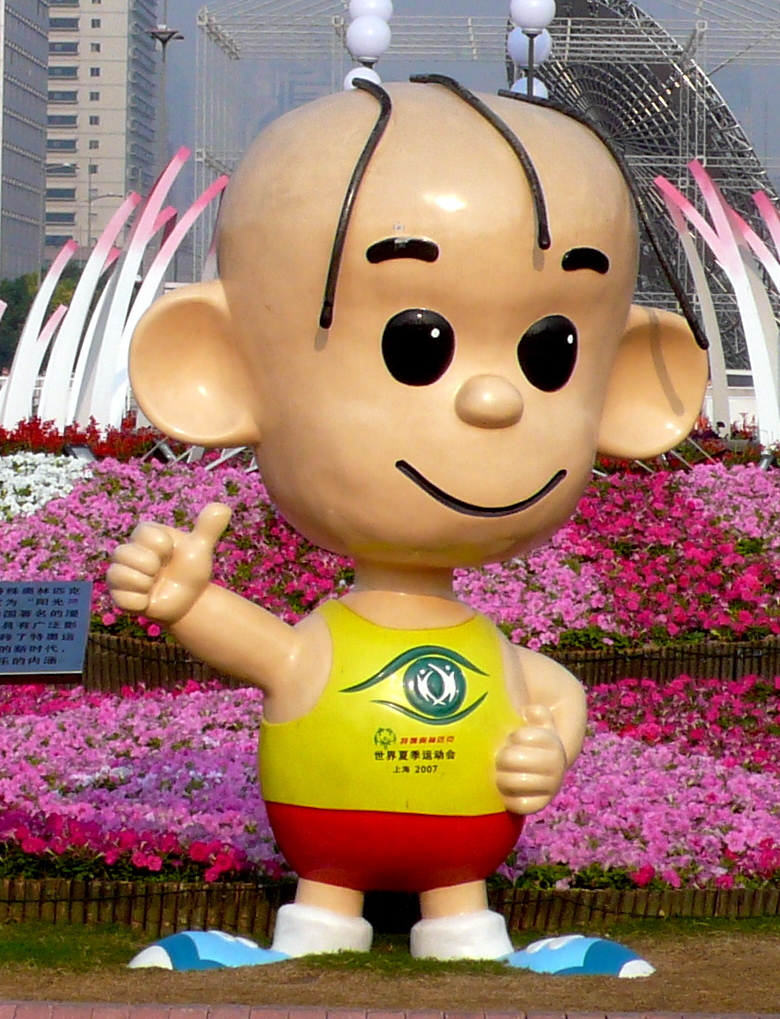
A statue of Sanmao, the mascot of the games, displayed in Pudong in front of the Shanghai Science and Technology Museum

The 2007 Special Olympics World Summer Games (Chinese: 2007年世界夏季特殊奥林匹克运动会; pinyin: 2007 Nián shìjiè xiàjì tèshū àolínpǐkè yùndònghuì) were held in Shanghai, China.

== Venues ==
A select list of venues used during the games:

- Shanghai Pudong Swimming Arena
- Shanghai Stadium
- Shanghai Indoor Stadium
- Fudan University
- Qizhong Forest Sports City Arena

== Events ==
- Aquatics
- Athletics
- Badminton
- Basketball
- Bocce
- Bowling
- Cycling
- Equestrian
- Floor hockey
- Football
- Golf
- Gymnastics
- Judo
- Kayaking
- Powerlifting
- Roller skating
- Sailing
- Softball
- Table tennis
- Team handball
- Tennis
- Volleyball
- Cricket
- Dragon boat
- Dragon Lion
- MATP

== Young Athletes introduction ==
Concluding its pilot run in 2006, The Special Olympics officially introduced Young Athletes, a sports program for children aged 2–7 with intellectual disabilities. It was designed to get the children exposed and interested in sports before they are eligible to compete in the Special Olympics. It was tested in 11 other countries and over 10,000 children participated.

== Revenue and expenses ==
The Games made a total of $101,663,833 in revenue, gains, and other financial support. It was a $16,898,416 increase compared to the year before. Total expenses for the year were $101,010,125, another increase from 2006, this time worth $19,841,738.

== Founder receives award ==
Special Olympics founder, Eunice Kennedy Shriver was awarded with the Minerva Award for Lifetime Achievement two weeks after the closing ceremony on October 23. She won the award for her contributions not only to the Special Olympics, but for efforts to help people with disabilities. The award is named after the Roman goddess Minerva and serves as a way to honor women who have sparked change in their communities, states, and nations.

== See also ==
- 2008 Summer Olympics
- 2009 Summer Deaflympics

Preceded by Ireland	Special Olympics World Summer Games	Succeeded by Athens, Greece
