= 2011 Special Olympics World Summer Games =

Multi-sport event in Athens, Greece

13th Special Olympics World Summer Games Παγκόσμιοι Θερινοί Αγώνες 13ου Ειδικού Ολυμπιακού
- Host city: Athens, Greece
- Motto: Join the wonderful winning world (Greek: Ενωθείτε με τον υπέροχο κόσμο των νικητών)
- Nations: 185
- Athletes: 7,000
- Events: 21
- Opening: 25 June 2011
- Closing: 4 July 2011
- Opened by: Karolos Papoulias
- Main venue: Panathenaic Stadium

Summer

Winter

The 2011 Special Olympics World Summer Games (Greek: Ειδικοί παγκόσμιοι καλοκαιρινοί αγώνες Ολυμπιακών Αγώνων 2011, Eidikoí pankósmioi kalokairinoí agónes Olympiakón Agónon 2011), was a sporting event in Athens, Greece. The opening ceremony of the games took place on 25 June 2011 at the Panathenaic Stadium and the closing ceremony was held on 4 July 2011.

Over 7,500 athletes, from 185 countries, competed in a total of 22 sports.

== Sports ==
- Aquatics
- Athletics
- Badminton
- Basketball
- Bocce
- Bowling
- Cricket
- Cycling
- Equestrian
- Floor hockey
- Football (Soccer)
- Golf
- Gymnastics
- Handball
- Judo
- Kayaking
- Powerlifting
- Roller skating
- Sailing
- Softball
- Table tennis
- Tennis
- Volleyball

== Nations ==
This is a list of countries participating in the 2011 Special Olympics World Summer Games (Greek: Pankósmioi Therinoí Agónes Athína 2011):

- Afghanistan
- Albania
- Algeria
- Andorra
- Argentina
- Armenia
- Aruba
- Australia
- Austria
- Azerbaijan
- Bahrain
- Bangladesh
- Barbados
- Belarus
- Belgium
- Belize
- Benin
- Bhutan
- Bolivia
- Bonaire
- Bosnia and Herzegovina
- Brazil
- British Virgin Islands
- Brunei
- Bulgaria
- Burkina Faso
- Cambodia
- Canada
- Cayman Islands
- Chile
- China
- Chinese Taipei
- Colombia
- Comoros
- Republic of the Congo
- Costa Rica
- Croatia
- Cuba
- Curaçao
- Cyprus
- Czech Republic
- Denmark
- Djibouti
- Dominican Republic
- East Timor
- Ecuador
- Egypt
- El Salvador
- Estonia
- Faroe Islands
- Finland
- Former Yugoslav Republic of Macedonia
- France
- Georgia
- Germany
- Gibraltar
- Great Britain
- Greece
- Guadeloupe
- Guatemala
- Guyana
- Haiti
- Honduras
- Hong Kong, China
- Hungary
- Iceland
- India
- Indonesia
- Iran
- Iraq
- Ireland
- Isle of Man
- Israel
- Italy
- Ivory Coast
- Jamaica
- Japan
- Jordan
- Kazakhstan
- Kenya
- Kosovo
- Kuwait
- Kyrgyzstan
- Laos
- Latvia
- Lebanon
- Libya
- Liechtenstein
- Luxembourg
- Macau, China
- Malawi
- Malaysia
- Maldives
- Mali
- Malta
- Mauritius
- Mexico
- Moldova
- Monaco
- Montenegro
- Montserrat
- Morocco
- Myanmar
- Namibia
- Nepal
- Netherlands
- New Zealand
- Niger
- Nigeria
- Norway
- Oman
- Pakistan
- Palestine
- Panama
- Paraguay
- Peru
- Philippines
- Poland
- Portugal
- Puerto Rico
- Qatar
- Réunion
- Romania
- Russia
- Rwanda
- St. Kitts and Nevis
- St. Lucia
- Samoa
- San Marino
- Saudi Arabia
- Senegal
- Serbia
- Seychelles
- Singapore
- Sint Maarten
- Slovakia
- Slovenia
- South Africa
- South Korea
- Spain
- Sri Lanka
- Sudan
- Suriname
- Swaziland
- Sweden
- Switzerland
- Syria
- Tajikistan
- Tanzania
- Thailand
- The Bahamas
- Tonga
- Trinidad and Tobago
- Tunisia
- Turkey
- Turkmenistan
- Uganda
- Ukraine
- United Arab Emirates
- United States of America
- Uruguay
- Uzbekistan
- Venezuela
- Vietnam
- Zambia

Preceded by Shanghai, China	Special Olympics World Summer Games	Succeeded by Los Angeles, United States
