= Joseph P. Kennedy Jr. Foundation =

Nonprofit foundation

The Joseph P. Kennedy Jr. Foundation is a non-profit foundation named in memory of Joseph P. Kennedy Jr., a lieutenant in the U.S. Navy killed in action during World War II, who was the elder brother of President John F. Kennedy. The foundation was set up in 1946 by his father, Ambassador Joseph P. Kennedy Sr., the patriarch of the Kennedy family. The foundation was led by Joseph P. Kennedy Jr.'s youngest brother, U.S. senator Edward M. Kennedy, until he died in 2009.

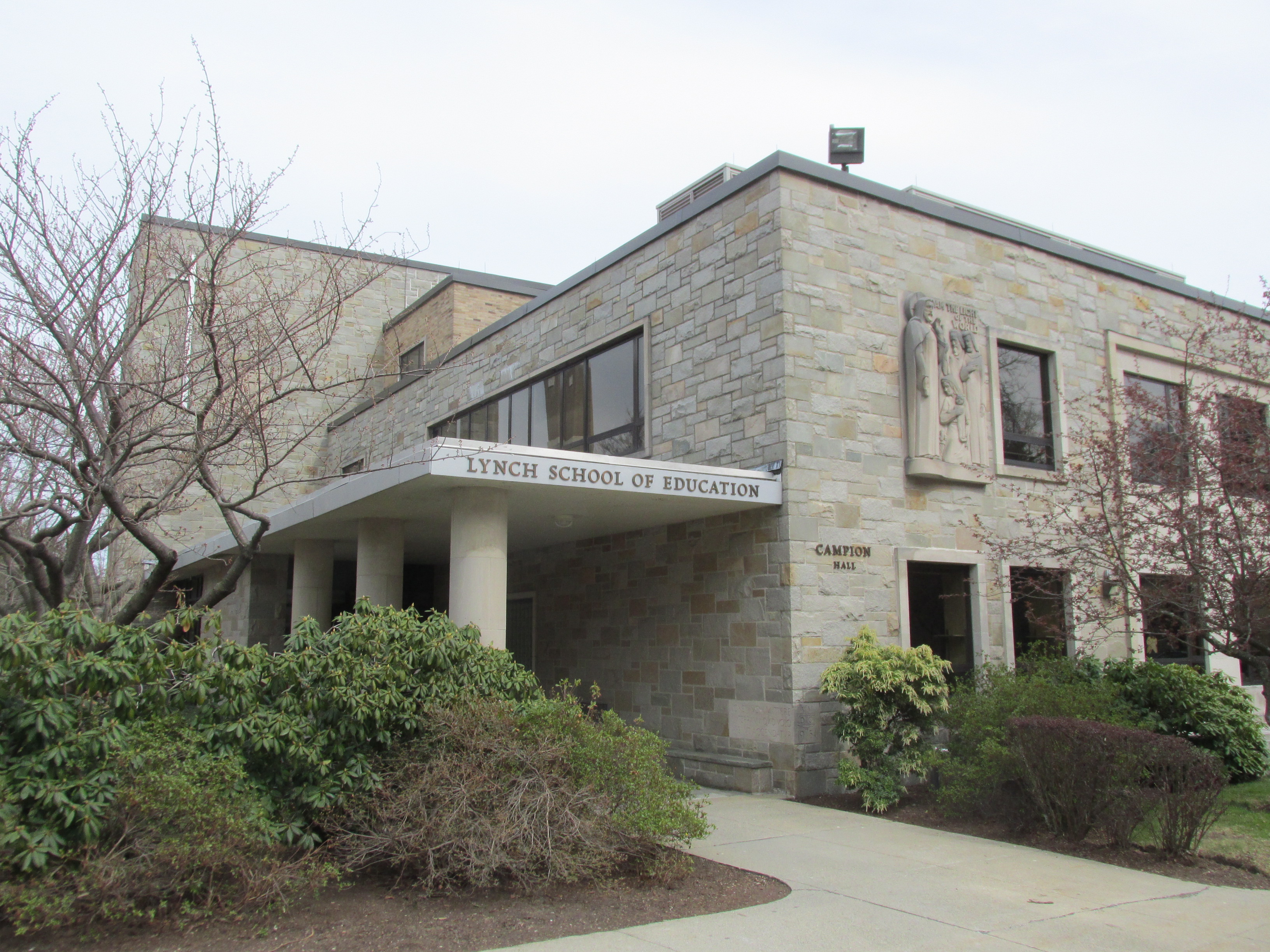
Joseph P. Kennedy Jr. Memorial Wing in Campion Hall, Boston College

The foundation funded the construction of the Joseph P. Kennedy Jr. Memorial Hall at Boston College, a part of Campion Hall and home to the college's Lynch School of Education. In 1957, the Lieutenant Joseph Patrick Kennedy Junior Memorial Skating Rink was opened in Hyannis, Massachusetts, with funds from the Joseph P. Kennedy, Jr. Foundation. In 2000, the foundation had assets of $30 million.
