= Buddhist socialism =

Socialism based on the principles of Buddhism

Buddhist socialism refers to a set of philosophies and political ideologies which synthesize the socioeconomic views and egalitarian values of socialism with the teachings and principles of Buddhism. A common feature of Buddhist socialism is that it sees the Buddhist goal of the inner transformation of the mind and the socialist goal of the transformation of socioeconomic relations as being deeply interdependent.

Both Buddhism and socialism seek to provide an end to suffering by analyzing its conditions (craving and the capitalist mode of production respectively) and removing its main causes through praxis (respectively, spiritual and political). Both also seek to provide a transformation of personal consciousness to bring an end to human alienation and selfishness. Buddhism approaches this mainly from the perspective of internal self-cultivation practices, while socialism tends to focus on external conditions and relations. The various forms of Buddhist socialism generally seek to synthesize both traditions of liberation, which are seen as complementary.

As there are numerous strains of socialism and Buddhism, so are there numerous forms of Buddhist socialism, with different perspectives on political praxis, metaphysics and views on how spiritual liberation is connected with sociopolitical liberation. Buddhist socialism emerged in the 19th and 20th centuries in various Asian nations as a response to colonialism, imperialism and the rise of global capitalism by Asian buddhists and socialists.

People who have been described as Buddhist socialists include Buddhadasa Bhikkhu, B. R. Ambedkar, Han Yong-un, Girō Senoo, Uchiyama Gudō, Inoue Shūten, Norodom Sihanouk, Takagi Kenmyo and Peljidiin Genden.

== Proto-socialist elements in pre-modern Buddhism ==
Buddhist socialists point to various primitive socialist elements found in Buddhist scriptures as well as in the welfare policies of ancient Buddhist institutions and rulers. These elements include a concern for social equality and communal harmony, a concern for social welfare, and a critique of casteism and social elitism. It also includes the practice of communal ownership and decision making within the Buddhist monastic community, which was considered the exemplary and superior way of life in Buddhist thought. These elements are considered by Buddhist socialists to anticipate the egalitarian concerns of modern socialism. Thus, authors like Samdhong Rinpoche write: "every socialistic and democratic principle in the realm of politics and socio-economic matter finds its origin in the Buddhist sutras."

Nevertheless these elements remain proto-socialist since they did not engage in any economic analysis or provide a theory of revolutionary change or economic transformation. Pre-modern Buddhists thus generally accepted the existing economic and political institutions of their time, while also promoting policies and virtues that lead to better social and economic conditions for all people and animals.

=== The monastic saṅgha as a model ===
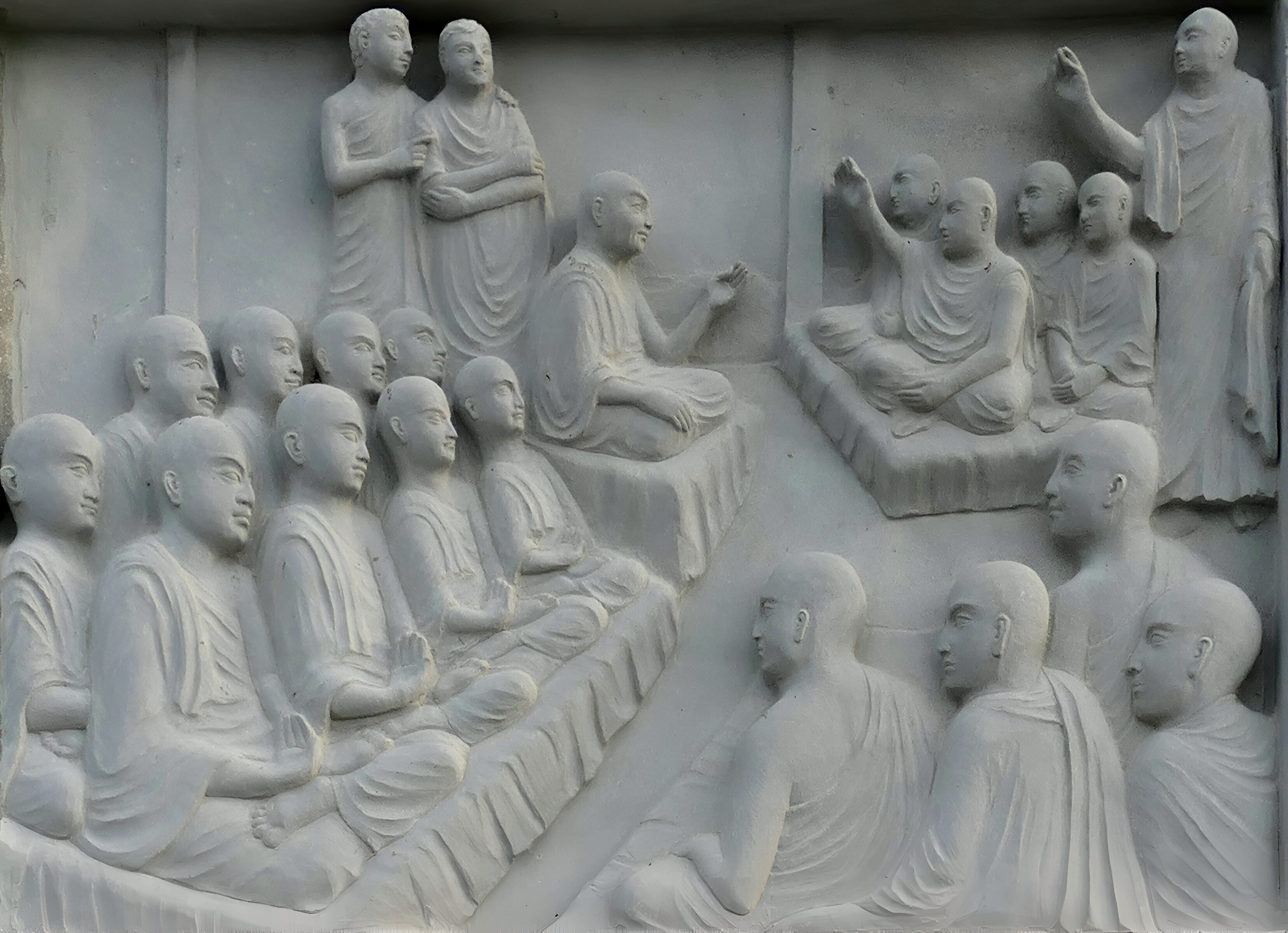
A relief depicting a discussion among Buddhist Monks at the Second Buddhist Council

The most ancient protosocialist element in Buddhism is found in the structure of the monastic community established by the Buddha, the sangha of monks and nuns. This community initially solely relied on donations from laypersons and was thus a kind of gift economy. In exchange for basic necessities, the sangha acted as the steward of the spiritual teachings of the Buddha. According to Buddhist socialists like Buddhadhasa, the ancient monastic community functioned as a society that "consumes and uses only what is necessary and does not store things, so no surpluses fall to anybody". Buddhadasa writes:

Thus we have an ideal socialist community without even knowing it. We could say it has existed in the administrative system of the Sangha from the time of the Buddha down to the present, or that it already exists in the system of Buddhist teaching. If we look at the way the Buddha conducted himself toward worldly beings, we will see that it was the ideal of socialism. (Dhammic Socialism p. 96)

Buddhist socialists see this ancient community, founded on loving-kindness towards all beings and on a spiritual selflessness, as being a socialist community. Thus, Christopher S. Queen notes that "the Buddhist order may be considered a primitive form of economic socialism". The ancient sangha's way of life, being based on communal living and joint decision making, is strikingly similar to modern utopian socialist experiments. This point has been made by modern Marxist scholars like Debiprasad Chattopadhyay (1918-1993), who argued that the saṅgha acted as "a refuge from emergent caste, class and lineage inequities - not unlike modern day communes imagined by utopian socialists".

The ancient sangha also made decisions based on consensus decision making, where all members had a vote regardless of social class. They were modeled on ancient Indian tribal councils (ganasangha). According to the Vinayas, any official act of the sangha, a saṅghakamma, cannot be dictated by a single leader or small bureaucratic elite, rather all sangha acts require local unanimous consensus of all members in the sangha's boundary (sīmā). Election mechanisms included the use of wooden tickets or ballots (salākā) and voting officers (salākā-gāhāpaka). In situations which threatened to tear the community apart, various methods of settling disputes (adhikaraṇa-samatha) would be employed, such as yebhuyyasikā (the rule of the majority).

The socialistic character of the early Buddhist sangha was governed by the monastic rule (vinaya) which applied equally to all, regardless of former social status or wealth. All monastics thus had to renounce all their property and status. In the core texts of the ancient buddhist monastic codes, like the Pātimokkhas and the Khandhakas (the monastic chapters), monastics (bhikkhus and bhikkhunis) are permitted only the simplest personal requisites (mainly their robe and bowl, along with a few other minor items like a needle for repairing the robe) and are not allowed to store food or grow their own food. Any larger donations given to the sangha belong to the community as a whole. Breaching these rules are considered to fall under the Nissaggiya Pācittiya offenses, all of which involve "an item that a bhikkhu has acquired or used wrongly, and that he must forfeit before he may “make the offense known”—confess it".

Thus the very process and requirements for monastic ordination acted as a social leveling mechanism, since individuals from all castes could join the sangha, where they cannot hoard wealth and will be treated as equals. This rejection of hereditary social hierarchy in favor of communal equality constitutes a key element of early Buddhist monasticism.

=== Critique of private property and caste ===
Buddhist socialists have relied on several Buddhist scriptures for their political theories. The Aggañña Sutta (DN 27) and its Chinese parallels is one of the key Buddhist scriptures which contain the beginnings of a Buddhist sociopolitical theory that socialists have drawn on. This sutta contains a cosmogonical tale that functions as social satire and as a critique of hierarchical caste-based Brahmanical society. In this scripture, the Buddha recounts how human beings lived in a harmonious natural state where people had no private property, eating only what grew from the earth. Over time, people became increasingly greedy, and began to hoard foodstuffs, leading to the decline of natural food supplies. This eventually led to the growth of social classes and agriculture as well as the establishment of borders around farms and fields, and thus to private property. This then led to theft and violence, which in turn led humans to come together and elect the first king to protect property from thieves.

According to Steven Collins, this text argues for the equality of all people, and the constructed nature of social hierarchy and political structures, against the brahmanical idea that the Indian social system and its castes was divinely ordained. It also associates accumulation of private property with the defilement of greed that Buddhism seeks to eliminate. As such, the Aggañña Sutta's account of social development has been interpreted as a critique of private property and capitalism by Buddhist socialists like the Burmese independence leader Aung San.

Collins also notes the connections between the text's story of social decay and the rules of the monastic sangha in Vinaya. The rules of the Vinaya which prohibit monks from constructing houses, using money and storing food mirror how these actions are seen as developing through greed in the Aggañña Sutta. As such, the ideal Buddhist monastic community is supposed to mirror the ideal society outlined in the text, before the moral decline and rise of hierarchical society. Collins also notes the satirical elements of this scripture, comparing to Western utopian literature.

=== Promotion of public welfare ===
Buddhist scriptures and rulers throughout history have also promoted social welfare policies. In Kutadanta Sutta for example, the Buddha identifies the root cause of social ills like crime and social unrest as being poverty. The Buddha then suggests that rulers faced with these problems should not rely on punishments and incarceration but rather:

So let the king provide seed and fodder for those in the realm who work in growing crops and raising cattle. Let the king provide funding for those who work in trade. Let the king guarantee food and wages for those in government service. Then the people, occupied with their own work, will not harass the realm. The king’s revenues will be great. When the country is secured as a sanctuary, free of being harried and oppressed, the happy people, with joy in their hearts, dancing with children at their breast, will dwell as if their houses were wide open.

This recommendation resembles modern social welfare policies and modern socialist critiques of criminal justice that address symptoms rather than economic causes. Similar recommendations are found in the Lion’s Roar of the Chakravartin (Cakkavattisīhanāda Sutta, DN 26), which outlines the duties of the ideal "wheel-turning ruler" (Pali: cakkavatti), an ideal which has been an important Buddhist model for secular leadership. These duties include just governance and policies promoting economic and social welfare. The scriptural narrative describes how a king fails to provide for the poor and the needy, which creates the conditions for crime, social unrest, and moral degeneration. The text states that the rise of crime is directly connected to the lack of proper welfare policy by rulers:

Thus, from the not giving of property to the needy, poverty became rife, from the growth of poverty, the taking of what was not given increased, from the increase of theft, the use of weapons increased, from the increased use of weapons, the taking of life increased, and from the increase in the taking of life, people’s life span decreased and their beauty decreased.

The Lion’s Roar of the Chakravartin also indicates that the righteous Dharma King will be primarily guided by the Buddha's Dharma and educate the people in virtue. They will also consult with the virtuous ascetics of his kingdom and listen to their council.

These ideals were put in practice by Buddhist rulers like the Mauryan Emperor Ashoka (c. 268–232 BCE). Ashoka is known for a program of social welfare that was implemented in his Mauryan kingdom, which some scholars have described as a "Buddhist welfare state". Ashoka's philosophy was communicated through Ashokan pillars, which present ideas indicative of "a moral polity of active social concern, religious tolerance, ecological awareness, the observance of common ethical precepts, and the renunciation of war," according to John S. Strong. Some of these welfare policies included the establishment of hospitals for humans and animals, the planting of groves that had medicinal uses, the construction of wells and rest houses along roads, and the appointment special officers (dharma-mahamatras) to oversee the welfare of all people. The social policies of Ashoka's kingdom promoted religious tolerance, equitable administration of justice and environmental protection.

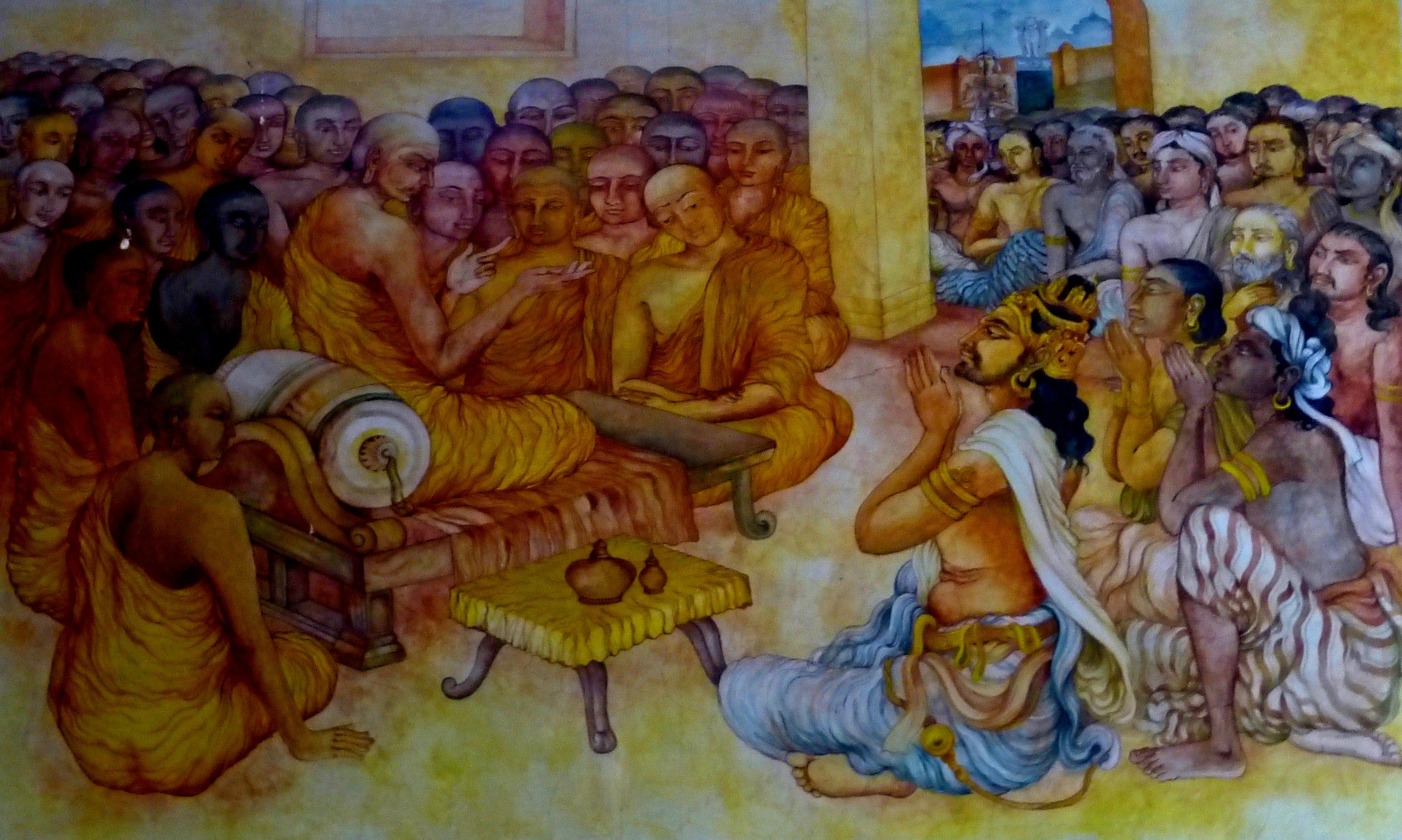
Ashoka and Monk Moggaliputta-Tissa at the Third Buddhist Council. Nava Jetavana, Shravasti.

Similar welfare policies are promoted in Mahayana Buddhist literature, such as Nagarjuna's (c. 150–250 CE) Precious Garland (Ratnāvalī) which provides advice on economic policy and social welfare based on Dharmic principles. In providing this advice, Nagarjuna bases himself on the universalist ethics of the Mahayana, which is founded on compassion for all sentient beings. Nagarjuna advices the king to pay for the education and medical care of his subjects, to provide for the needy and to develop his kingdom's infrastructure.

Thus Nagarjuna writes:

239: For the sake of increasing wisdom, provide for the livelihood of the schoolmasters in all the educational institutions of the land and formally grant estates to them.

240: With [the proceeds from] your fields establish wages for doctors and barbers [dentists], for the sake of the elderly, the young, and the ill so as to relieve the suffering of sentient beings.

241: You of good wisdom, establish rest houses and build parks and causeways, pools, pavilions, and cisterns; provide for bedding, grasses, and wood.

243: Out of your compassion, always care for the ill, the homeless, those afflicted by suffering, the downtrodden and unfortunate. Respectfully apply yourself to aiding them.

The verses also recommend that the state should "cause the blind, the sick, the lowly, the protectorless, the wretched and the crippled equally to attain food and drink without interruption;" and "provide extensive care for the persecuted, the victims (of disasters), the stricken and diseased." According to Robert Thurman, this advice amounts to a promotion of a welfare state, "a rule of compassionate socialism".

== Southeast Asian Theravada socialism ==
During the 20th century, various forms of Buddhist socialism emerged in Southeast Asia. As Southeast Asian nations are mostly Theravada Buddhist (except Vietnam), these forms combined Socialist theory with Theravada Buddhist modernism and the Theravada Buddhism of the Pali Canon.

=== Thai Dhammic socialism ===
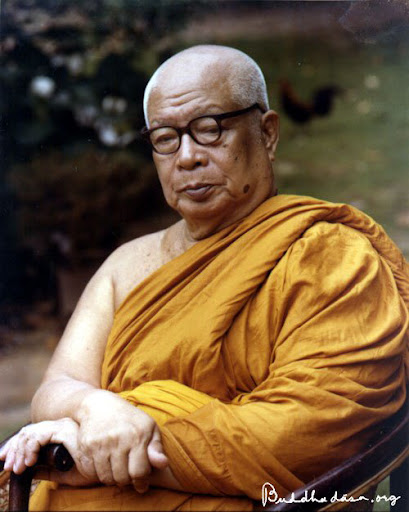
Buddhadāsa Bhikkhu

Buddhadāsa Bhikkhu (1906–1993) coined the phrase "Dhammic socialism" (Pali: dhammika sanghaniyama). He believed that socialism is a "natural state," meaning all things exist together in one balanced interdependent system. He points to animals who live dependent on each other and on nature, without hoarding excessive surpluses as an example of "natural" (dharmic) socialism. The core of Buddhadāsa's socialism is non-attachment to the sense of self, and the principle of non-hoarding which is likely influenced by the Aggañña Sutta. According to Preecha Changkhwanyuen, for Buddhadāsa, "for society to maintain a natural balance there must be no taking of surpluses. Surplus is not evil if it is justly distributed, but it is exploitation to store surplus as a personal possession. Everyone wants a surplus, and that is why there is competition and conflict."

Buddhadāsa argued in that since primitive peoples lived without hoarding surpluses, they lived in a kind of natural socialism. Problems arose however when "some began to learn how to amass and were clever enough to produce. They competed with each other to produce and to amass, and grab too many things, more than what was necessary, for themselves. This is where the problem began". Thus, while he affirms non-violence, he sees the root of social ills as being those capitalists who "appropriate power, influence and money and whatever else to make themselves richer and richer". Buddhadāsa sees the main solution to this is right view and the rule of a righteous ruler (dhammarāja) that rules through Dharma principles. Right view is the Dharmic view which understands that suffering arises from greed, hatred and delusion, and that hoarding wealth is not a solution to suffering.

Buddhadāsa's Buddhist Socialism influenced later Thai Buddhist activists like Sulak Sivaraksa. Like Buddhadāsa, Sivaraksa has criticized global capitalism and consumerism on Buddhist grounds, arguing that these phenomena are rooted in the defilements and in the view of a self:

When an individual places self-interest above all and negates the relation view of ‘self,’ the result is greed and selfishness. Neoliberalist rhetoric deludes people and international organizations into believing that profits from multinational corporations will be fairly distributed in society and that any improvement in material conditions is an absolute gain for society. The ideology of consumption deludes people into believing that constant acquisition of goods and power will lead to happiness. (Sivaraksa, “Alternatives to Consumerism” in A. Badiner, Mindfulness in the Marketplace, Parallax Press, 2002: 136)

=== U Nu's Happy Land socialism ===
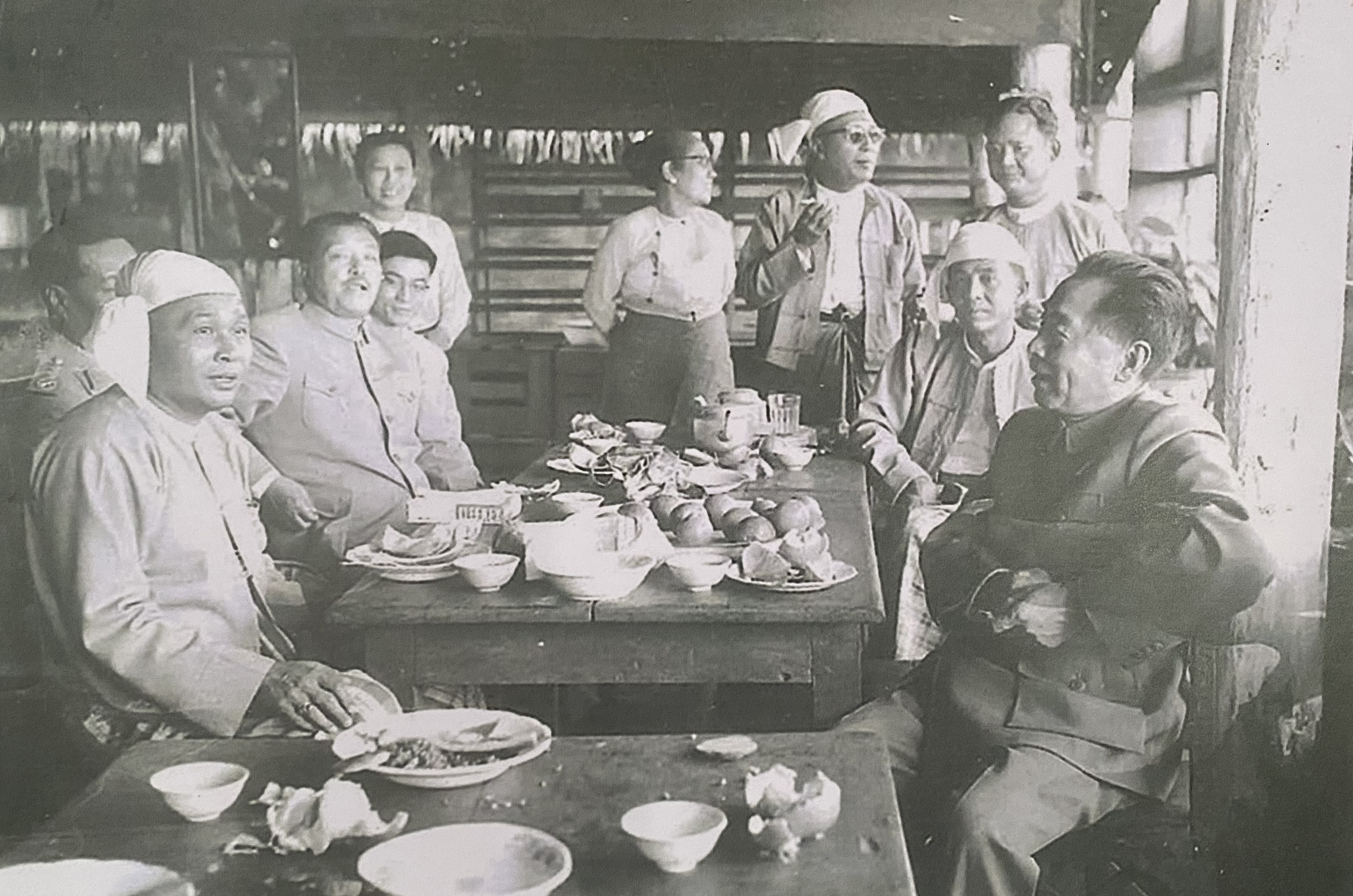
Zhou Enlai (first from the right) and He Long (second from the left) having dinner with U Nu (first from the left)

Following independence from British rule, U Nu (1907–1995) Burma’s first Prime Minister, worked to integrate Theravada Buddhist principles with democratic socialist economics. A leader of the Anti-Fascist People's Freedom League (AFPFL), U Nu saw capitalism as fundamentally un-Buddhist due to its focus on the profit motive and wealth accumulation over the well being of the people and the ending of suffering. U Nu believed that the people of Burma would only be able to develop into a community if people overcame their self-acquisitive instincts. To enable individuals to do this, the state should guarantee basic needs, especially the four basic requisites of food, shelter, clothing and medicine and minimize class distinctions. U Nu also held that the state should encourage all people to develop themselves morally and spiritually through Buddhist practice. Thus the state would help meet basic material needs while Buddhism helped meet people's spiritual needs.

In 1952, U Nu's government launched the Pyidawtha Plan (Happy Land Plan), attempting to build a Buddhist welfare state where material security would liberate citizens from poverty and allow them to better pursue spiritual practice. This era ended with Ne Win’s 1962 military coup, which replaced it with a secular, authoritarian "Burmese Way to Socialism."

The American economist E. F. Schumacher, then a UN economic adviser to U Nu, coined the term "Buddhist economics" in 1956 which he would outline in his 1966 essay of the same name. Schumacher's ideas would also later be developed in the 1973 Small Is Beautiful.

=== Sinhalese Buddhist socialism ===
Mid-20th century Sri Lanka saw the rise of Buddhist Socialists like S.W.R.D. Bandaranaike. Bandaranaike employed Buddhist socialist ideas to build an anti-colonial political movement. This era also saw the rise of Sinhalese Marxist parties like the Lanka Sama Samaja Party which included prominent monk activists (such as the monk Walpola Rahula) who developed Buddhist modernist views that saw the historical Buddha as a radical social reformer who fought against caste hierarchies. For example, according to Rahula:

Buddhism arose in India as a spiritual force against social injustices, against degrading superstitious rites, ceremonies and sacrifices; it denounced the tyranny of the caste system and advocated the equality of all men; it emancipated woman and gave her complete spiritual freedom.

As such, Walpola Rahula held that monks had a role to play in a nation's politics and defended this through his citation of the Pali scriptures. His Heritage of the Bhikkhu (Bhikshuvakage Urumaya) was an influential book that described his understanding of the role of the monk in society, defending their entrance into politics as a form of social service. Rahula's message was part of a broader movement of left-wing Buddhist scholars centered around Vidyalankara University which also included the popular socialist scholar monk Yakkaduwe Pragnarama.

=== Cambodian Buddhist socialism ===
The Cambodian king and politician Norodom Sihanouk (1922–2012) was a major figure who promoted a royalist form of Buddhist Socialism in 20th century Cambodia where the king was seen as a provider of social welfare for the people and as a defender and supporter of the Buddhist faith.

== East Asian Mahayana Socialism ==
=== Japanese Buddhist socialism ===
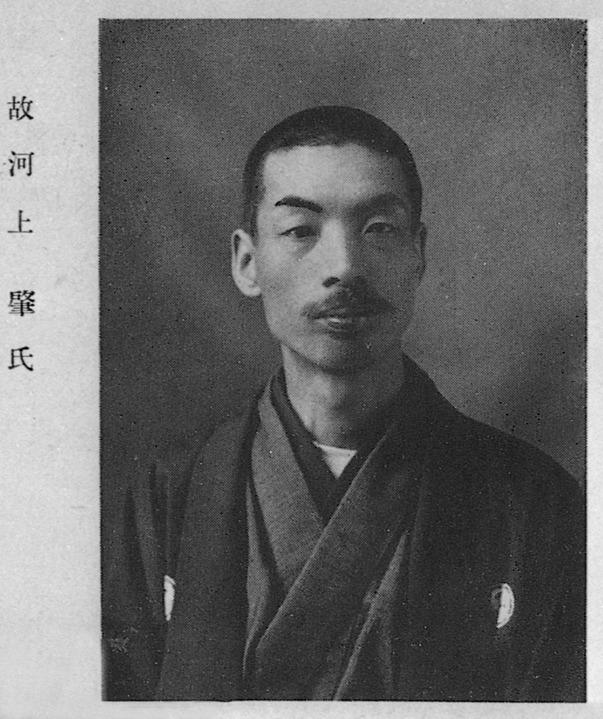
Kawakami Hajime

During the late Meiji period (1868–1912), numerous Japanese Buddhist left-wing figures emerged in opposition to the rise of modern capitalism, imperialism and the state's religious policies. These Buddhists drew on socialist thinkers and on Mahayana Buddhist values. While the mainstream Japanese Buddhist schools tended to support Japanese imperialism, several left-wing figures criticized this and were often persecuted for it by the Japanese government. The highest profile persecution of leftists was the High Treason Incident (1911) in which several socialists were accused of plotting to assassinate the emperor, including several Buddhist figures.

Buddhist influences can already be seen in the party regulations of the short lived Eastern Socialist Party (Tōyō Shakaitō 東洋社会党) founded by Tarui Tōkichi 樽井藤吉 (1850–1922) in 1882. This document contains clear Buddhist influenced language, such as "we will stand on the principle of equality of self and other (J. jita byōdō 自他平等, [Skt. ātma-para-samatā])," and other phrases which are found in Buddhist scriptures like "skillful means". Tarui writes that as “children of the Buddha” (J. busshi 仏子), party members have a duty to look upon all beings with compassion.

Several Japanese radical thinkers of the 20th century synthesized various traditions of Mahayana Buddhism with various forms of socialism and other left-wing radical ideologies like anarchism. These figures came from different traditions of Japanese Buddhism like Zen, Jōdo Shinshū and Nichiren. They include the Sōtō anarcho-communist Uchiyama Gudō (1874–1914), Inoue Shūten (1880-1945), the Shin priest Takagi Kenmyō (1864–1914), the philosopher Miki Kiyoshi (1897–1945), economist Kawakami Hajime (1879–1946), the labor organizer Suekawa Hiroshi (1899–1982) who was also known for his defense of the Burakumin, the Nichirenist Marxist Girō Senoo (1889–1961) and Kita Ikki (1883–1937), who combined socialism with statist Nichiren nationalism.

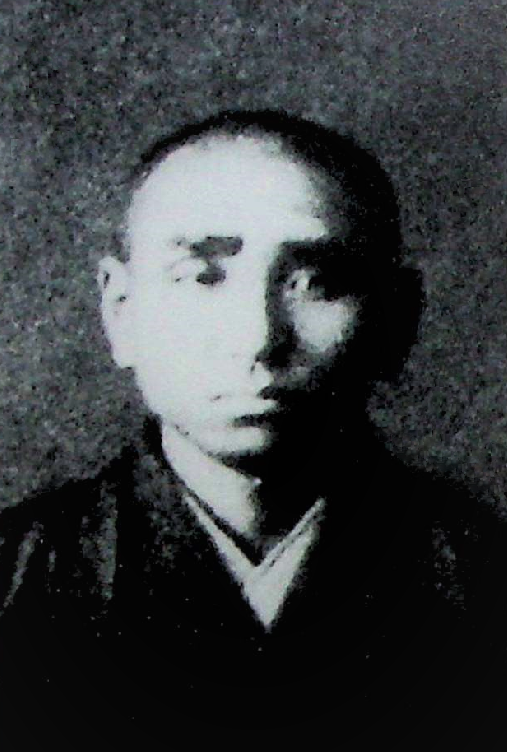
Takagi Kenmyō

According to James Mark Shields, the Shin priest Takagi Kenmyō (1864–1914) "may well be the first ordained Buddhist priest to explicitly and publicly embrace socialism", while also "insisting that it was simply an expression of his personal faith". Takagi was the head priest of Wakayama's Jōsenji (浄泉寺), which had a large number of burakumin in its community. The plight of his parishioners led Takagi to embrace social activism. He was imprisoned during the High Treason Incident and lived the rest of his life in prison. In his essay My Socialism (Yo ga shakaishugi), Takagi Kenmyō draws on Shin and Socialist thought, seeing socialist activism as a kind of Buddhist practice, but grounding it traditional Shin concepts like other-power and shinjin.

As Shields writes, "Takagi clearly believed that the best bulwark against selfishness and injustice is to maintain an external standard (that is, Amida), representing “the absolute transcendental compassion” (Takagi 2002: 55)." Takagi also points to the life of Shakyamuni and Shinran as moral exemplars who actively cared for the poor and the lower classes. He also compares the ideal socialist world with the Pure Land, writing “the Land of Bliss is the place in which socialism is truly practiced.” Unlike some other socialists of his time, Takagi rejected violent action, and he chastised fellow Buddhists who promote violence and "pray to the kami and buddhas for victory."

Girō Senoo, was a Nichiren Buddhist Marxist who founded the Youth League for Revitalizing Buddhism in 1931. Seno asserted that capitalism was fundamentally evil because it structurally violated the Buddhist precept against stealing through the exploitation of labor and generated vast suffering. As such, he advocated for a classic Marxist project on Mahayana Buddhist grounds. Senoo was critical of orthodox Marxists who denied the importance of spirituality for the socialist struggle, and of Buddhists who supported capitalism and imperialism.

=== Chinese Buddhist socialism ===
During the 20th century, various Chinese thinkers worked to integrate Buddhism with socialist and communist ideas. One of the most influential Chinese Buddhist figures who combined elements of anarchism, socialism and Buddhism was Taixu (1890–1947). Taixu's "Humanistic Buddhism" (Rensheng Fojiao) was influenced by socialist and anarchist ideas and promoted great monastic social engagement that worked towards poverty relief and egalitarianism in the Buddhist community as well as in the broader Chinese society. Taixu believed Buddhist teachings could be mobilized to eliminate poverty, exploitation, and class divisions, thus leading to a kind of Pure Land in this world. According to Bart Dessein, he was particularly influenced by Saint-Simonianism. Taixu's Humanistic Buddhism had a profound impact on modern Chinese Buddhism. Numerous Chinese Buddhist organizations today draw on the Engaged Buddhism of Taixu.

Another important figure was Ju Zan (1908–1984), a disciple of Taixu who worked together with the Chinese Communist Party (CCP) after 1949, defending the idea that Buddhist monks should aid in laboring and education.

=== Vietnamese Buddhist socialism ===
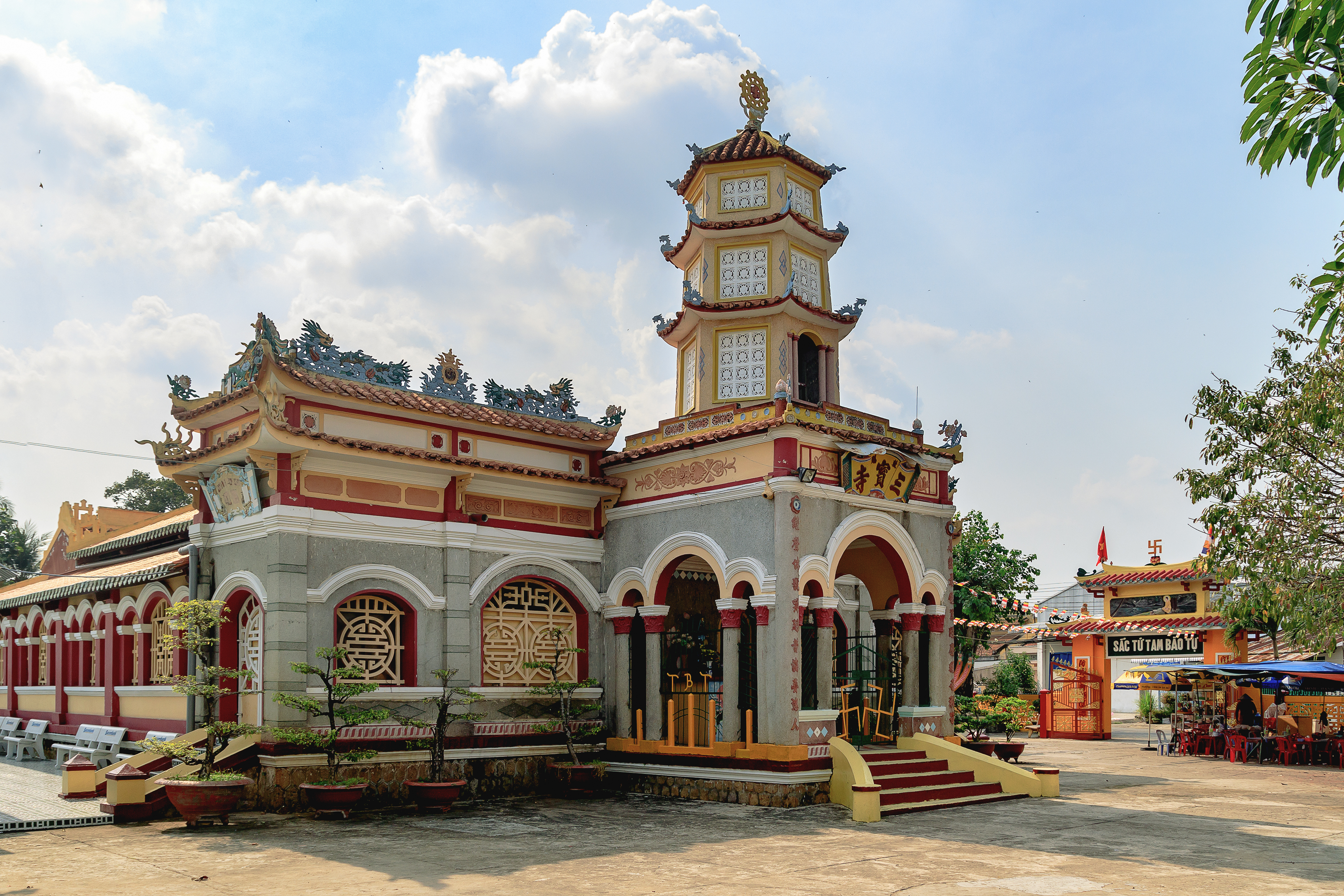
Tam Bảo Temple was one of several Buddhist temples which acted as bases for revolutionary activity during the 20th century

Thich Thien Chieu, a Buddhist monk, revolutionary and writer (under the pen name Xích Liên) was joined the Vietnam Revolutionary Youth Association in 1928 and became a member of the Communist Party of Vietnam in 1930, being the first monk to join the party. In 1934, he shifted to underground activities and served in the Southern Region Party Committee. Under the pen name Xích Liên, he made a case for Marxism by drawing on Buddhist doctrine in his various writings. He founded the Buddhist Studies and Welfare Association, worked on the newspaper Tiến Hóa, and established an orphanage at Tam Bảo Temple. Together with Venerable Thí Thiền and Venerable Thiện Ân, he also organized a weapons production workshop at Tam Bảo Temple in support of the Southern Vietnam Uprising against the French.

The Vietnamese revolutionary Ho Chi Minh drew on Buddhist values in developing his socialist vision. While he was primarily a secular political leader, Ho had a deep respect for the Buddhist teachings and the role they played in Vietnamese culture. During the Vietnam war, numerous monks joined the fight and aided the Communist movement, while Buddhist pagodas also served as bases for revolutionaries. Following reunification in 1975, the state consolidated all Buddhist organizations into the government-sanctioned Vietnam Buddhist Sangha (VBS, est. 1981). The VBS operates under the official national motto: "Dharma - Nation - Socialism" and participates in charitable activities like maintaining medical clinics. Independent Buddhist groups not affiliated with VBS, such as the banned Unified Buddhist Church of Vietnam, remain restricted by the government and are only able to operate openly in exile.

The 20th century also saw the development of the Vietnamese Democratic Socialist Party, founded in 1946 by Huỳnh Phú Sổ, who also founded the new religion of Hòa Hảo. This party eventually dissolved after the killing of Huỳnh Phú Sổ and the fall of South Vietnam.

=== Korean Buddhist socialism ===
Korean Buddhist reformer Han Yong-un felt that equality was one of the main principles of Buddhism. In an interview published in 1931, Yong-un spoke of his desire to explore Buddhist Socialism:

I am recently planning to write about Buddhist socialism. Just like there is Christian socialism as a system of ideas in Christianity, there must be also Buddhist socialism in Buddhism.

== Indian Buddhist socialism ==
20th century India saw the recovery of Buddhism by Indian modernists as well as the rise of Indian socialist thought. Numerous Indian political figures and intellectuals discussed the connections and similarities between the two ideologies. They include B.R. Ambedkar, Dharmanand Kosambi (1876-1947), Rahul Sankrityayan, Debiprasad Chattopadhyay, Haraprasad Shastri, Y. Balaramamoorty, Ram Vilas Sharma, the Communist Party of India members R. B. More and Annabhau Sathe and Dalit and Shudra writers Namdeo Dhasal, Anand Teltumbe and Kancha Illiah.

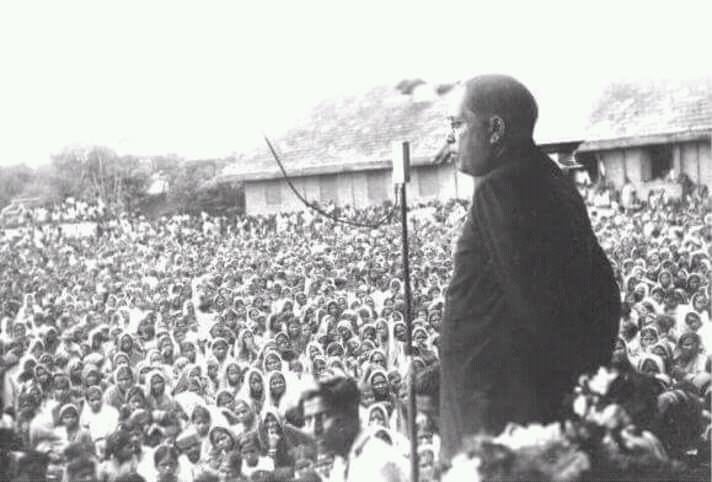
Ambedkar delivering a speech

=== Ambedkar ===
The most influential Buddhist socialist in India is BR Ambedkar (1891–1956), founder of the Dalit Buddhist movement and the leading figure of Ambedkarism. Ambedkar held that the Indian Dalits and other lower marginalized castes should abandon Hinduism for Buddhism, since Hinduism was tainted by caste ideology. He argued that socialism could never be achieved in India without dismantling socio-religious caste system and saw conversion to Buddhism as a way to uplift the marginalized castes. For Ambedkar, since Indian society was founded on a religious ideology, the economy could not be transformed without religious transformation. Marxists' focus on economic forces as the only engine of historical change failed to understand this fact. He also held that orthodox Marxism lacked a solid ethical framework, and thus needed an infusion of spiritual Buddhist virtues. He thus developed a new form of socially engaged and activist Buddhism which he called Navayana.

In his 1947 States and Minorities, Ambedkar advocated for a state socialism established through democratic means rather than through violent insurrection. Ambedkar shared the Marxist goal of eliminating poverty, exploitation, and class inequality, but he also rejected the orthodox Marxist method due to its materialism and reliance of violent revolution. Ambedkar saw violent revolutions as inherently unstable and often leading to the destruction of liberty and the rise of authoritarianism. Ambedkar also saw Marxist historical materialism as reductive and ignorant of the power of religious and cultural systems that could be just as influential as material conditions. The Buddhist way, on the other hand, is based on the transformation of the mind and moral exhortation. Ambedkar criticized Soviet communism for sacrificing individual liberty and its focus on revolutionary violence. He advocated for socialism within a democratic framework, rooted in the principles of liberty, equality, and fraternity.

In his Buddha or Karl Marx (1956), Ambedkar argued that the historical Buddha had anticipated the essential goals of socialism, but had grounded them in the virtues of the Dharma rather than state coercion. The Buddha's Dharma, according to Ambedkar, is founded on three key principles, the first of which is the rejection of divine justification for social hierarchies (such as the brahmanical caste system). Dharma is also founded on the virtues of universal compassion and equality, using the sangha as a model for all society. According to Ambedkar, socialism needs spiritual virtues in order to full accomplish its goals. Ambedkar also sees the Buddhist theory of governance as being based on that of the ancient tribal republics, such as that of the Vajjika League.

=== Sankrityayan ===
Rahul Sankrityayan (1893-1963) was another influential Indian Buddhist socialist. Born a brahmin, Rahul was an anti-colonial activist who converted to Buddhism in Sri Lanka and became a monk. He also later became a Marxist activist, working with the Indian Communist Party.

== 14th Dalai Lama ==
Tenzin Gyatso, the Fourteenth Dalai Lama of Tibet has said that:

Of all the modern economic theories, the economic system of Marxism is founded on moral principles, while capitalism is concerned only with gain and profitability. ... The failure of the regime in the former Soviet Union was, for me, not the failure of Marxism but the failure of totalitarianism. For this reason I still think of myself as half-Marxist, half-Buddhist.

== Socialists on Buddhism ==
Karl Marx was certainly aware of Buddhism, though he does not analyze it in any significant way in his writings. Nevertheless, in a letter, Marx mentions that:

I have become myself a sort of walking stick, running up and down the whole day, and keeping my mind in that state of nothingness which Buddhism considers the climax of human bliss.

This indicates he was at least aware of some Buddhist principles. According to Sam Dresser, Socialism shares with Marxism the basic structure of analyzing the causes of suffering and prescribing a treatment. Dresser also compares Marx's view of the self to the Buddhist view. Dresser argues that for Marx, since the self is determined by the totality of all social and economic relations, there is no fixed self.

In the final chapter of his Mutual Aid: A Factor of Evolution, the anarcho-communist philosopher Peter Kropotkin discusses how religions have relied on mutual aid throughout history, mentioning Buddhism alongside others:

Even the new religions which were born from time to time... have only reaffirmed that same principle. They found their first supporters among the humble, in the lowest, downtrodden layers of society, where the mutual-aid principle is the necessary foundation of everyday life; and the new forms of union which were introduced in the earliest Buddhist and Christian communities, in the Moravian brotherhoods and so on, took the character of a return to the best aspects of mutual aid in early tribal life.

== See also ==
- Buddhist economics
- Engaged Buddhism
- Religious socialism
