= Religious socialism =

Form of socialism based on religious values

Religious socialism is a type of socialism based on religious values and religious worldviews. Members of several major religions have found that their beliefs about human society fit with socialist principles and ideas. As a result, religious socialist movements have developed within these religions. Those movements include Buddhist socialism, Christian socialism, Islamic socialism, Jewish socialism and Hindu versions such as Gandhian socialism. There has also existed radical, egalitarian interpretations of religions in pre-Modern times (e.g. Mazdakism, Lingayats).

== Early modern socialism and religion ==
Religious socialism was the early form of socialism and pre-Marxist communism. In Christian Europe, communists were believed to have adopted atheism. In Protestant England, communism was too close to the Roman Catholic communion rite; hence socialist was the preferred term. Friedrich Engels argued that in 1848, when The Communist Manifesto was published, socialism was respectable in Europe while communism was not. The Owenites in England and the Fourierists in France were considered respectable socialists, while working-class movements that "proclaimed the necessity of total social change" denoted themselves communists. This branch of socialism produced the communist work of Étienne Cabet in France and Wilhelm Weitling in Germany.

Some view the early Christian Church, as described in the Acts of the Apostles, as an early form of communism and religious socialism. The view is that communism was just Christianity in practice, and Jesus was the first communist. This link was highlighted in one of Karl Marx's early writings, which stated that "[a]s Christ is the intermediary unto whom man unburdens all his divinity, all his religious bonds, so the state is the mediator unto which he transfers all his Godlessness, all his human liberty". Furthermore, Thomas Müntzer led a significant Anabaptist communist movement during the German Peasants' War which Engels analysed in The Peasant War in Germany. The Marxist ethos that aims for unity reflects the Christian universalist teaching that humankind is one and that there is only one god who does not discriminate among people. Pre-Marxist communism was also present in the attempts to establish communistic societies such as those made by the Essenes and the Judean desert sect.

In the 16th century, English writer Thomas More, venerated in the Catholic Church as Saint Thomas More, portrayed a society based on common property ownership in his treatise Utopia, whose leaders administered it through reason. Several groupings in the English Civil War supported this idea, especially the Diggers, who espoused clear communistic yet agrarian ideals. Oliver Cromwell and the Grandees' attitude to these groups was, at best, ambivalent and often hostile. Criticism of the idea of private property continued into the Enlightenment era of the 18th century through such thinkers as the profoundly religious Jean-Jacques Rousseau. Raised a Calvinist, Rousseau was influenced by the Jansenist movement within the Roman Catholic Church. The Jansenist movement originated from the most orthodox Roman Catholic bishops who tried to reform the Roman Catholic Church in the 17th century to stop secularization and Protestantism. One of the main Jansenist aims was democratizing to stop the aristocratic corruption at the top of the Church hierarchy. The participants of the Taiping Rebellion, who founded the Taiping Heavenly Kingdom, a syncretic Christian-Shenic theocratic kingdom, are viewed by the Chinese Communist Party as proto-communists.

== Variants within world religions ==
=== Buddhist socialism ===
Buddhist socialism advocates socialism based on the principles of Buddhism. Both Buddhism and socialism seek to provide an end to suffering by analyzing its conditions and removing its leading causes through praxis. Both also seek to provide a transformation of personal consciousness (respectively, spiritual and political) to bring an end to human alienation and selfishness. People described as Buddhist socialists include Buddhadasa Bhikkhu, B. R. Ambedkar, S. W. R. D. Bandaranaike, Han Yong-un, Girō Senoo, U Nu, Uchiyama Gudō and Norodom Sihanouk.

Bhikkhu Buddhadasa coined the phrase "Dhammic socialism". He believed that socialism is a natural state, meaning all things exist together in one system. Han Yong-un felt that equality was one of the main principles of Buddhism. In an interview published in 1931, Yong-un spoke of his desire to explore Buddhist socialism: "I am recently planning to write about Buddhist socialism. Just like there is Christian socialism as a system of ideas in Christianity, there must be also Buddhist socialism in Buddhism."

Tenzin Gyatso, the Fourteenth Dalai Lama of Tibet, stated that "[o]f all the modern economic theories, the economic system of Marxism is founded on moral principles, while capitalism is concerned only with gain and profitability. [...] The failure of the regime in the former Soviet Union was, for me, not the failure of Marxism but the failure of totalitarianism. For this reason I still think of myself as half-Marxist, half-Buddhist".

=== Christian socialism ===
Some individuals and groups, past and present, are both Christian and socialist, such as Frederick Denison Maurice, author of The Kingdom of Christ (1838). Another example is the Christian Socialist Movement, affiliated with the British Labour Party. Distributism is an economic philosophy formulated by such Catholic thinkers as G. K. Chesterton and Hilaire Belloc to apply the principles of social justice articulated by the Roman Catholic Church, especially in Pope Leo XIII's encyclical Rerum novarum.

The teachings of Jesus are frequently described as socialist, especially by Christian socialists. Acts 4 (Acts 4:35) records that in the early church in Jerusalem, "[n]o one claimed that any of their possessions was their own", although the pattern would later disappear from church history except within monasticism. Christian socialism was one of the founding threads of the British Labour Party and is claimed to begin with the uprising of Wat Tyler and John Ball in the 14th century CE.

Various Catholic clerical parties have at times referred to themselves as Christian Social. Two examples are the Christian Social Party of Karl Lueger in Austria before and after World War I and the contemporary Christian Social Union in Bavaria. Nonetheless, these parties have never espoused socialist policies and have always stood on the conservative side of Christian democracy. Hugo Chávez of Venezuela was an advocate of a form of Christian socialism as he claimed that Jesus was a socialist.

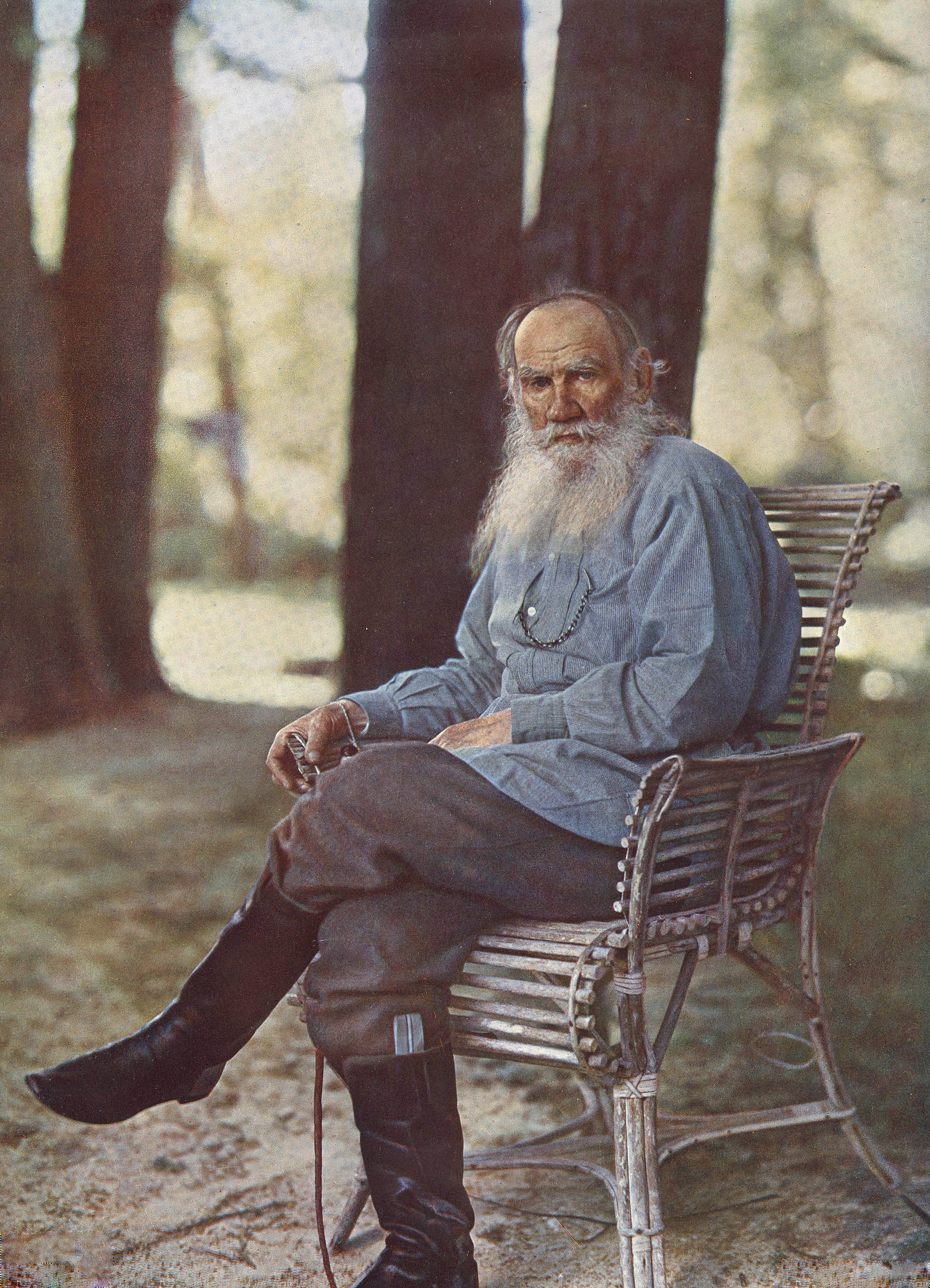
Leo Tolstoy

Christian anarchism is a Christian movement in political theology that combines anarchism and Christianity. The foundation of Christian anarchism is a rejection of violence, with Leo Tolstoy's The Kingdom of God Is Within You regarded as a key text. Tolstoy sought to separate Russian Orthodox Christianity—which was merged with the state—from what he believed was the true message of Jesus as contained in the Gospels, specifically in the Sermon on the Mount. Tolstoy believed that all governments that wage war, and churches that support those governments, are an affront to the Christian principles of nonviolence and nonresistance. Although Tolstoy never actually used the term Christian anarchism in The Kingdom of God Is Within You, reviews of this book following its publication in 1894 appear to have coined the term. Christian anarchist groups have included the Doukhobors, Catholic Worker Movement and the Brotherhood Church.

Christian communism is a form of religious communism based on Christianity. It is a theological and political theory based upon the view that the teachings of Jesus Christ compel Christians to support communism as the ideal social system. Although there is no universal agreement on the exact date when Christian communism was founded, many Christian communists assert that evidence from the Bible (in the Acts of the Apostles) suggests that the first Christians, including the apostles, established their small communist society in the years following Jesus' death and resurrection. Many advocates of Christian communism argue that it was taught by Jesus and practised by the apostles. Some independent historians confirm it.

The Hutterites believed in strict adherence to biblical principles and church discipline, and practised a religious form of communism. In the words of historians Rod Janzen and Max Stanton, the Hutterites "established in their communities a rigorous system of Ordnungen, which were codes of rules and regulations that governed all aspects of life and ensured a unified perspective. As an economic system, Christian communism was attractive to many of the peasants who supported social revolution in sixteenth century central Europe", such as the German Peasants' War, and "Friedrich Engels thus came to view Anabaptists as proto-Communists."

=== Islamic socialism ===
Islamic socialism incorporates Islamic principles into socialism. As a term, it was coined by various Muslim leaders to describe a more spiritual form of socialism. Scholars have highlighted the similarities between the Islamic economic system and socialist theory, as socialism and Islam are against unearned income. Muslim socialists believe that the teachings of the Quran and Muhammad—especially the zakat—are compatible with the principles of socialism. They draw inspiration from the early Medinan welfare state established by Muhammad. Muslim socialists found their roots in anti-imperialism. Muslim socialist leaders believe in the derivation of legitimacy from the public.

Islamic socialism is the political ideology of Libya's Muammar al-Gaddafi, former Iraqi president Ahmed Hassan al-Bakr, Syrian president Hafez al-Assad, and Zulfikar Ali Bhutto, the Pakistani leader of the Pakistan Peoples Party. The Green Book, written by Gaddafi, consists of three parts, namely "The Solution of the Problem of Democracy: 'The Authority of the People'", "The Solution of the Economic Problem: 'Socialism'" and "The Social Basis of the Third Universal Theory". The book is controversial because it completely rejects modern conceptions of liberal democracy and encourages the institution of a form of direct democracy based on popular committees. Critics charged that Gaddafi used these committees as tools of autocratic political repression in practice.

Abu Dharr al-Ghifari, a companion of Muhammad, is credited by multiple authors as a principal antecedent of Islamic socialism.

=== Jewish religious socialism ===
Judaism, as a religion based around the tribal identity of Am Yisrael, which is to say, an ethno-religion, believing in their unique role in bringing about the Messianic Age, has historically had a different way of seeing political movements compared to other religious groups.

Many Jewish mystics, especially Hasidic and neo-Hasidic rabbis, have often been the main proponents of Jewish religious socialism. Yehuda Ashlag, a Polish Hasidic rabbi, known as the Baal HaSulam, was a committed devotee to the study of Kabbalah and the Tree of Life. He became known for his commentary on the Zohar, saw socialism as a step towards the messianic redemption; he also advocated for socialism and communism in Poland. Martin Buber, a German-Jewish neo-Hasidic mystic, existentialist philosopher, and Zionist federalist bi-nationalist, was an advocate of what he referred to as communitarian socialism. Buber's communitarian socialism was expanded upon in his 1949 book Paths to Utopia, in which he introduces his theory of "dialogical community" founded upon "dialogical relationships." Within socialist Zionism, one religious movement was HaPoel HaMizrahi. Its members believed that socialism represented a positive development toward the prophetic utopia envisioned in tikkun olam. One of its leaders, Rabbi Isaiah Shapiro, argued that the Torah requires a just society and cited scriptual and rabbinic sources, to support his opposition to the idea of absolute personal ownership.

Secular Jews have been major forces in the history of the communist and labour movements in Europe, the United States, Algeria, Iraq, Ethiopia, and modern-day Israel. Jews have a rich history of involvement in communism, socialism, Marxism and Western liberalism. However, many of them were irreligious and did not connect their views to Jewish theology. Among these movements included socialist Zionism, Bundism, and support for gentile socialist movements such as Marxism or anarchism. Even within these more secular movements, however, there was sometimes a religious overtone, especially with socialist Zionism. For example, A. D. Gordon, though the de facto leader of the secular Jewish socialist Zionist movement Hapoel Hatzair, conceived of his ideas, such as Hebrew labor and Arab-Jewish unity, in religious terms, reflecting his childhood growing up in an Orthodox Jewish household.
