= Junzaburō Nishiwaki =

Japanese poet and literary critic

Nishiwaki Junzaburō
- 西脇 順三郎
- Nishiwaki Junzaburō
- Born: 20 January 1894; Ojiya, Niigata Japan
- Died: 5 June 1982 (aged 88); Ojiya, Niigata, Japan
- Resting place: Zōjō-ji, Shiba, Tokyo Japan
- Education: Keio University; New College, Oxford
- Occupations: Writer, Translator, Literary Critic
- Writing career
- Genre: poetry
- Notable awards: Yomiuri Prize (1957)
- Literary movement: modernism, surrealism

Junzaburō Nishiwaki (西脇 順三郎, Nishiwaki Junzaburō; 20 January 1894 – 5 June 1982) was a Japanese poet and literary critic, active in Shōwa period Japan, specializing in modernism, Dadaism and surrealism. He was also a noted painter of watercolors.

Between 1960 and 1966, Nishiwaki received 7 nominations for the Nobel Prize in Literature.

== Early life ==
Nishiwaki was born in what is now part of the city of Ojiya in Niigata Prefecture, where his father was a banker. He came to Tokyo intending to become a painter and studied under the famous Fujishima Takeji and Kuroda Seiki but had to give up an artistic career due to his father's sudden death. Instead, he enrolled in Keio University's Department of Economics, and also studied Latin, English, Greek, and German. Even as a student he demonstrated extraordinary language abilities, writing his thesis entirely in Latin. As a student, he was drawn to the works of Arthur Symons and Walter Pater, as well as the art works of French symbolism.

== Literary career ==
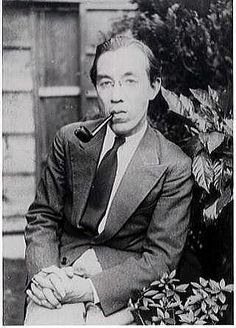
Nishiwaki

Nishiwaki became interested in poetry while a student at Keio University, and contributed verses to the boy's magazine Shonen Sekai. He also began to write poetry in English. Nishiwaki expressed distaste for the romanticism and subjective modes which dominated modern Japanese poetry.

After graduation, in April 1917, he was hired by The Japan Times newspaper, but left over a management dispute a few months later. He then found a position at the Bank of Japan in March 1918, but was forced to resign due to poor health. Through the introduction of a friend, he was then accepted at the Ministry of Foreign Affairs in June 1919. Nishiwaki then accepted a teaching post at Keiō University in April 1920, while continuing to contribute English verses to various journals, and editing poetry magazines on the side.

In 1922, Nishiwaki decided that he wanted to study in England, and took the steamer Kitano Maru from Kobe in 1922. However, he arrived too late to be admitted to a university, and spent a year in London at ease, meeting with authors including John Collier and Sherard Vines. He lived at the Hotel Rowland in Kensington in 1923, and visited Scotland in July. He was finally admitted to New College, Oxford in May 1924, enrolling in the honors course, and travelling to France and Switzerland in his free time. While at Oxford, over the next three years he was introduced to modernist literature and the works of James Joyce, Ezra Pound, and T. S. Eliot. He was also fascinated by Charles Baudelaire and developments in the French surrealism, and even attempted to compose some works in French. His first volume of poetry, Spectrum (1925), was written in English and published in London at his own expense. While in England, Nishiwaki married Marjorie Biddle in 1924, but divorced her in 1932. He remarried to Saeko Kuwayama in 1932, by whom he had a son.

Returning to Japan in November 1925, Nishiwaki accepted a position as a professor at Keiō University's Faculty of Letters and taught the history of English Literature as well as a range of courses in linguistics. A later exhibition catalogue treats student circles around Nishiwaki as one early point of origin for Surrealism in Japan and identifies Shūzō Takiguchi as one such student. Alongside his academic work, he kept writing on the side, and was especially inspired by the poetry of Hagiwara Sakutarō, whom he lauded as one of the great poets of the Taishō period. Nishiwaki experimented with new techniques, and began writing poetry in Japanese for the first time. In 1927, he published Japan's first surrealist poetry magazine, Fukuiku Taru Kafu Yo. The next year, along with collaborators such as Anzai Fuyue, he brought out another new magazine Shi to Shiron ("Poetry and Poetic Theory") and became a leader of the new contemporary poetry movement. In 1933, he published Ambarvalia, a collection which gathered together the previous experiments and efforts in writing poetry in Japanese; however, Nishiwaki suddenly stopped publishing after the outbreak of the Second Sino-Japanese War in 1937, and announced that he would concentrate on research of the classics and ancient literature. He was one of the 14 poets arrested on charges of sedition, after the introduction of the National Mobilization Law as government censors chose to interpret some of his surrealistic poems in a critical manner. During World War II, he evacuated to Chiba Prefecture with his library of over 3000 volumes, and later to back to his hometown of Ojiya in Niigata.

== Later literary career ==
Nishiwaki lived in Kamakura, Kanagawa Prefecture, during the Pacific War years of 1942–1944. After the war, in 1947, he revealed another major anthology titled Tabibito kaerazu ("No Traveler Returns"). Nishiwaki also devoted effort to translation, publishing a Japanese version of T. S. Eliot's The Waste Land, which was received with great critical acclaim. He followed this with yet another collection of his own verse in 1953, titled Kindai no gūwa ("Modern Fables"). While writing poetry and translations, Nishiwaki continued teaching at Keiō University until his retirement in 1962.

Nishiwaki was awarded the prestigious Yomiuri Prize in 1957. In 1962, Nishiwaki was appointed to the Japan Art Academy, and at the invitation of Alitalia and the Italian Institute for the Middle East, he was invited to Europe. In September 1967, he visited Montreal in Canada to speak at the World Poetry Conference. In 1971, he was designated a Person of Cultural Merit by the Japanese government. Nishiwaki was elected a Foreign Honorary Member of the American Academy of Arts and Sciences in 1974 and awarded the Order of the Sacred Treasure, 2nd class, by the Japanese government. Nishiwaki was nominated for the Nobel Prize in Literature in 1960, 1961, 1962, 1963, 1964, 1965 and 1966.

Nishiwaki died of heart failure at the age of 88 at his hometown in Niigata. His grave is at the temple of Zōjō-ji in Shiba, Tokyo.

== See also ==
- Japanese literature
- List of Japanese authors
