= Shi to shiron =

Japanese modernist poetry and criticism magazine

'Shi to shiron'
- Editor: Haruyama Yukio
- Categories: Poetry, literary criticism
- Frequency: Quarterly
- Publisher: Kōseikaku Shoten
- First issue: September 1928
- Final issue: January 1932
- Country: Japan
- Based in: Tokyo
- Language: Japanese

Shi to shiron (詩と詩論) was a Japanese quarterly magazine of poetry and criticism published in Tokyo by Kōseikaku Shoten. It was founded in September 1928, ran to 14 numbered issues by December 1931, and was followed by a special issue in January 1932. From March 1932 it continued under the new title Bungaku, which remained in print until June 1933. Edited by Haruyama Yukio, it was one of the central magazines of early Shōwa poetic modernism and an important venue for the reception of Surrealism and European and Anglo-American modernist literature in Japan.

== History and profile ==
Reference works describe Shi to shiron as one of the major poetry magazines of early Shōwa modernism and note that it was modeled in part on the Paris avant-garde review transition. The magazine gathered a wide range of younger poets, including Fuyue Anzai, Tatsuji Miyoshi, Fuyuhiko Kitagawa, Toshio Ueda, Azuma Kondo, Takeshi Takiguchi, Iku Takenaka, Junzaburō Nishiwaki, Kazuho Yoshida, and Shūzō Takiguchi. Later encyclopedic accounts describe Haruyama's editorial line in terms of esprit nouveau and the "purification" of poetry, with an emphasis on formal experiment, anti-realist poetics, image and form, and a dry, intellectual tone.

The magazine published short poems, prose poems, formalist verse, surrealist poetry, and cine-poems, while also functioning as a venue for the translation and study of new overseas literature. It gave sustained attention to writers such as Paul Valéry, André Gide, James Joyce, and T. S. Eliot, and helped introduce Japanese readers to modernist writers in English, including Ezra Pound and Gertrude Stein.

== Reception of foreign literature and Surrealism ==
Shi to shiron was also an important early venue for the reception of French Surrealism in Japan. Annika A. Culver notes that Kitagawa's Japanese translation of André Breton's first Manifesto of Surrealism appeared in issues 4 and 5 in 1929. The August 1930 issue included a translation by Sei Itō of a story by Ernest Hemingway. In 1931 the magazine also carried work by Chika Sagawa; later research treats Shi to shiron and its successor titles as one of her principal publication venues, and a chronology of her career records six poems reprinted in issue 12 in June 1931.

According to later reference works, disagreements over the magazine's intellectualist line and its rejection of overt ideology and musicality contributed to a split within the group, and Kitagawa, Miyoshi, and others went on to launch Shi to genjitsu in 1930.

== Related publications ==
In addition to the main quarterly, Kōseikaku issued the special supplement Gendai eibungaku hyōron ("Modern English Literary Criticism") in November 1930 and the annual Shōsetsu ("Novel") in January 1932. After the January 1932 special issue, the magazine was continued under the new title Bungaku, which remained in print until June 1933.

== Holdings ==
The National Diet Library holds issues 1 to 14 of Shi to shiron as well as the January 1932 special issue. The library also serves a microform version under call number YA-86, although that microfilm set lacks issues 5 and 6. CiNii Books lists holdings for Shi to shiron at 36 libraries, as of 12 April 2026.

== Legacy ==
Later reference works treat Shi to shiron as one of the central periodicals of Japanese poetic modernism and as a major vehicle for establishing modernist poetics in Japan. One encyclopedia entry describes it as a "monumental" poetry magazine of early Shōwa literary culture. Ryūichi Kaneko later wrote that Kansuke Yamamoto's early interest in modern art was nurtured in part by reading Shi to shiron together with the Nagoya surrealist poetry journal Ciné.

== See also ==
- Ciné
- Yoru no Funsui
- Surrealism in Japan
- Kansuke Yamamoto (artist)
