= Cinepoetry =

Cinepoetry (or cinepoem) originally meant arts of motion pictures with poetic sense but came to mean cinematic poetry (or poem).

== Examples in former meaning ==
- Man Ray's films
- Matt Robinson's films
- Stark Electric Jesus (India)

== Examples in latter meaning ==
- Benjamin Fondane's poems
- Fuyuhiko Kitagawa's or Iku Takenaka's poems
- For Rent (Sakutaro Hagiwara)

== See also ==
- Closet screenplay
- Video poetry
- Video art
- Lesescenario

== Reference books ==
- Cinepoetry: Imaginary Cinemas in French Poetry (Verbal Arts: Studies in Poetics) by Christophe Wall-romana
- Cinepoems and others by Benjamin Fondane
- Scenario's Charm(シナリオの魅力 Shinario No Miryoku) by Fuyuhiko Kitagawa

ASIN: B000JBAEZQ
