= Iku Takenaka =

Japanese poet

Iku Takenaka (竹中郁, Takenaka Iku 1904–1982) was a Japanese poet from Hyogo prefecture. He graduated from Kwansei Gakuin University. His best-known work is a cinepoem Rugby.

He met Ryunosuke Akutagawa who wrote closet screenplays, just before Akutagawa's suicide, and then, in Akutagawa's home, he also met Tatsuo Hori, whose work 'Kaze Tachinu' inspired Hayao Miyazaki's last work. He also met Man Ray in Paris, when Ray created cinepoems, to interview Ray for a magazine.

His Dharma name was Shunkōin Shisen Ikudō Koji (春光院詩仙郁道居士).

== See also ==
- Fuyuhiko Kitagawa
- Fuyue Anzai
- Ryōhei Koiso - his friend
