= Chika Sagawa =

Japanese poet

Aiko Kawasaki (1911–1936), also known as Chika Sagawa (左川 ちか, Sagawa Chika), was a Japanese avant-garde poet.

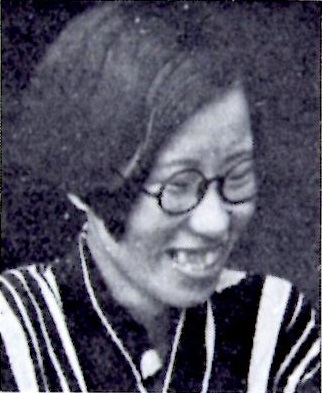
Sagawa Chika

== Biography ==
Chika Sagawa, née Aiko Kawasaki, was born in Yoichi, Hokkaido, Japan, in 1911. She started studies to become an English teacher, but moved to Tokyo at the age of seventeen to join her brother, Kawasaki Noboru, who was already established in literary circles. They became part of Arukuiyu no kurabu (Arcueil Club), a modernist literary group centred on Katué Kitasono, who championed her work.

Kawasaki took on the pen-name Sagawa, from the characters for left and river, a likely allusion to the Left Bank of the Seine.

Her first publication was a translation of the Hungarian writer Ferenc Molnár, while her first poem, Konchu (Insects) was published the following year. In her translations, she focused on mainstream poets, but her own poems were influenced by surrealism. Another source cites Aoi Uma (The Blue Horse) as Sagawa's first poem, appearing in August 1930.

Sagawa's poems appeared in the Arcueil Club's magazine Madame Blanche, and she participated in the journal Shi to Shiron (Poetry and Poetics), a publication venture for Japanese avant-garde poets collectively called l'esprit nouveau. Her translations of James Joyce, Virginia Woolf and other contemporary European writers appeared in these magazines, as well as Bungei Rebyû (The Literary Review).

Sagawa developed stomach cancer in 1935 and died in January 1936, aged 24.

== Selected works ==
- James Joyce, Chamber Music, 1932, Shiinokisha – translated by Sagawa Chika
- Virginia Woolf, "A Haunted House" (published in Japanese as 憑かれた家) – translated by Sagawa Chika
- To the Vast Blooming Sky. Mindmade Books. 2006. – English translation by Sawako Nakayasu
- Mouth: Eats Color: Sagawa Chika Translations, Anti-Translations, & Originals. Factorial. 2011. ISBN 978-0975446850. – English translation by Sawako Nakayasu
- The Collected Poems of Chika Sagawa. Canarium. 2015. ISBN 978-0984947164. – English translation by Sawako Nakayasu
