= Takagi Kenmyō =

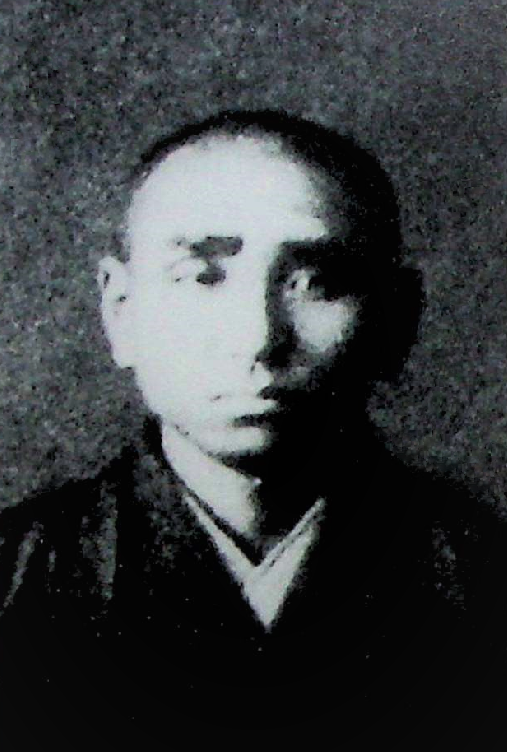
Takagi Kenmyō

Takagi Kenmyō (高木顕明, June 24, 1864 – June 24, 1914) was a Buddhist priest of the Ōtani-ha school of Jōdo Shinshū. He was a Buddhist socialist and one of the defendants in the Kōtoku Incident.

== Biography ==
Takagi was born in Shimo-Otai Village, Nishikasugai District, Owari Province (present-day Kiyosu City, Aichi Prefecture). He served as the 12th head priest of Jōsen-ji Temple in Shingū City, Wakayama Prefecture.

During the Russo-Japanese War, he was one of the few anti-war advocates in Japan. He also opposed the licensed prostitution system and gradually moved toward socialism due to the plight of the burakumin in his community.

In 1910, he was arrested on suspicion of involvement in the Kōtoku Incident after hosting a discussion meeting led by Kōtoku Shūsui at Jōsen-ji Temple. He was initially sentenced to death, but his sentence was later commuted to life imprisonment.

After his arrest, Takagi was expelled from the Ōtani-ha of Jōdo Shinshū. This punishment extended to his family as well; it was a severe measure that forced the entire family to leave the sect. In 1914, he committed suicide while serving his sentence at Akita Prison.

On April 1, 1996, more than 80 years after his death, the Jōdo Shinshū Otani-ha restored his status as a priest and cleared his name. Today, a commemorative monument stands in Shingū City.

== Political Thought ==
In his article My Socialism (余が社会主義), released in 1904, Takagi drew on both Pure Land Buddhist and socialist thought to develop a theory of Buddhist socialism through concepts such as shinjin and tariki. He believed in the Pure Land of Sukhavati as "the place in which socialism is truly practiced", and, according to James Mark Shields, "that the best bulwark against selfishness and injustice is to maintain an external standard (that is, Amida), representing “the absolute transcendental compassion” (Takagi 2002: 55)". Takagi also completely rejected violence to reach a socialist society, and advocated for pacifism.
