= Inoue Shūten =

Japanese Zen Buddhist scholar

Inoue Shūten (井上秀天, 1880-1945) was a Japanese Zen Buddhist scholar and advocate for socialist and the anti-war activist from the Meiji period to the early Showa period.

== Life ==
Inoue entered a Sōtō Zen temple at the age of nine and later studied Indian philosophy at Komazawa University. During his travels throughout south China, Ceylon, Burma, and India, he met Anagarika Dharmapala and was deeply influenced by the region's Theravāda Buddhist traditions. These experiences, along with his socialist leanings, influenced his strong pacifism and opposition to Japanese imperialism. Inoue was also a member of the Japanese Socialist organization called the Kobe People's Club (J. Heimin Kurabu).

Inoue was critical of Japanese militarism and of "Imperial Way Buddhism," which supported Japanese imperialism. He also criticized Suzuki Daisetsu for defending the idea that Buddhists could be effective soldiers.

== See also ==
- Japanese resistance to the Empire of Japan in World War II
- Buddhist socialism
- Uchiyama Gudō
