= J. L. Ilsley High School =

Location
- 138 Sylvia Avenue; Halifax, Nova Scotia, B3R 1J9; Canada; 44°36′28″N 63°36′36.2″W

Information
- School type: High school
- Motto: "Justitia et Doctrina per Tempus" (Justice and Wisdom Through Time)
- Founded: 1971
- School board: Halifax Regional School Board
- Principal: Marilyn MacGibbon
- Grades: 9-12
- Enrollment: 1,024 (2023)
- Language: English, French immersion
- Colours: Purple and White
- Team name: Judges
- Website: jli.hrce.ca//

J.L. Ilsley High School is a Canadian high school located in Spryfield in the eastern part of Halifax, Nova Scotia. The school is named after James Lorimer Ilsley, a former federal cabinet minister who served in Prime Minister William Lyon Mackenzie King's World War II government and was later Chief Justice of the Supreme Court of Nova Scotia. The school opened in 1971. Funding for the construction of a new school to replace the existing structure was announced in 2018. The province of Nova Scotia has opened the new school for the 2021–2022 school year. When the new school opened there were no smoke alarms or functioning security cameras in the school.

== Notable alumni ==
- Jackie Barrett, Special Olympics Powerlifter, amassed 15 Powerlifting medals at four Special Olympics World Games appearances
- Joey Comeau – writer, creator of A Softer World
- Matt Robinson – poet
- Peter North – pornographic performer and producer
- Shane Bowers – professional ice hockey player
