= Darius James =

American novelist

- Born: 1954 (age 71–72); United States
- Occupation: Author
- Writing career
- Genre: Non-fiction

Darius James (a.k.a. Dr. Snakeskin, born 1954) is an African-American author and performance artist. He is the author of That's Blaxploitation: Roots of the Baadasssss 'Tude (Rated X by an All-Whyte Jury), an unorthodox, semi-autobiographical history of the blaxploitation film genre, and Negrophobia: An Urban Parable, a satirical novel written in screenplay form.

His work is influenced by the Voodoo religion. James lives in Hamden, Connecticut.

He appeared in the 2006 film Black Deutschland (James had lived in Berlin). He co-wrote and appeared in a feature-length film released in 2013, The United States of Hoodoo.

== Books ==
- That's Blaxploitation: Roots of the Baadasssss 'Tude (Rated X by an All'Whyte Jury)
- Negrophobia: An Urban Parable
- Voodoo Stew (German/English), Verbrecher Verlag Berlin, 2004
- Froggie Chocolate's Christmas Eve / Froggie Chocolates Weihnachtsabend (German/English), Verbrecher Verlag Berlin, 2005

== See also ==
- Closet screenplay
