= Matt Robinson (poet) =

Canadian poet (born 1974)

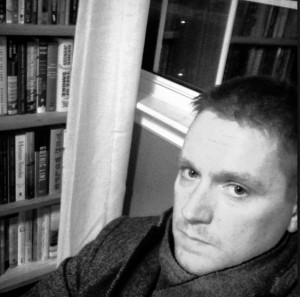
- Robinson in December 2015
- Born: February 24, 1974 (age 52); Halifax, Nova Scotia
- Education: St. Mary’s University; Mount Saint Vincent University; University of New Brunswick
- Website: http://www.mattrobinsonpoet.wordpress.com

Matt Robinson (born 1974) is a Canadian poet born in Halifax, Nova Scotia.

His first collection, A Ruckus of Awkward Stacking (2000), was published by Toronto's Insomniac Press, and was a finalist for both the Gerald Lampert Award and the ReLit Award for Poetry. Subsequent collections, published by Toronto's ECW Press, include how we play at it: a list (2002), no cage contains a stare that well (2005), and Against the Hard Angle (2010). In addition to his full-length collections, he has also published five chapbooks: tracery & interplay (Frog Hollow Press, 2004), Against the Hard Angle (Greenboathouse Press, 2009), a fist made and then un-made (Gaspereau Press, 2013), which was short-listed for the bpNichol Chapbook Award, The Telephone Game (Baseline Press, 2017), and Against (Gaspereau Press, 2018). Robinson's, Some Nights It's Entertainment; Some Other Nights Just Work, was published by Kentville, Nova Scotia's awarding-winning Gaspereau Press in Fall 2016 and his new collection, Tangled & Cleft, was released by Gaspereau Press in Fall 2021.

Robinson's poems have won a number of awards including the Petra Kenney International Poetry Prize, Grain Magazine's Prose Poem Award, and The Malahat Review Long Poem Prize. He has also received the New Brunswick Foundation for the Arts Emerging Artist of the Year Award.

His poems have also appeared in a number of anthologies, including The New Canon, Breathing Fire 2, Coastlines: The Poetry of Atlantic Canada, Exact Fare Only 2, and Landmarks: An Anthology of New Atlantic Canadian Poetry of the Land, and been featured in programs such as the Halifax Regional Municipality's Art in Public Places and Poetry in Motion initiatives. His poem 'grand parade, halifax' is publicly featured in Halifax's Grand Parade Square, and his poem 'the grain elevators' was produced as a cinepoem (in collaboration with filmmaker Megan Wennberg) as a part of the A Certain Openness: the filming of poetry project sponsored by AFCOOP and WFNS.

Robinson holds a BA and a BSc from Saint Mary's University, a BEd from Mount Saint Vincent University, and an MA from the University of New Brunswick. He is a graduate of Halifax's J. L. Ilsley High School.

Robinson worked at Dalhousie University as a Residence Life Manager (in Howe Hall) from 2007 to 2012. He currently serves as Director - Housing & Conference Services at Saint Mary's University in Halifax, Nova Scotia.

== Bibliography ==
- A Ruckus of Awkward Stacking, Insomniac Press, 2000.
- how we play at it: a list, ECW Press, 2002.
- tracery & interplay, Frog Hollow Press, 2004. (chapbook)
- no cage contains a stare that well, ECW Press, 2005.
- Against the Hard Angle, Greenboathouse Press, 2009. (chapbook)
- Against the Hard Angle, ECW Press, 2010.
- a fist made and then un-made, Gaspereau Press, 2013. (chapbook)
- Some Nights It's Entertainment; Some Other Nights Just Work, Gaspereau Press, 2016.
- The Telephone Game, Baseline Press, 2017 (chapbook)
- Against, Gaspereau Press, 2018 (chapbook)
- Tangled & Cleft, Gaspereau Press, 2021.
