= Black Deutschland =

2006 documentary film

- Directed by: Oliver Hardt
- Country of origin: Germany
- Original languages: German; English

Production
- Producer: de-Arte
- Running time: 55 minutes

Original release
- Release: January 27, 2006

Black Deutschland is a made-for-television documentary film, directed by Oliver Hardt and produced by de-Arte. The documentary is filmed in different cities in Germany and features people from all across the black diaspora who reside in Germany. Some have German parents, others are immigrants. The film was released in Germany on 27 January 2006. It is based on Hardt's 2005 book of the same name.

Filmed in German and English, Black Deutschland investigates the lives of these people to understand and explore identity formation in Germany. Different forms of black identity are expressed.

One theme the documentary really delves into is the idea of diversity in blackness. Throughout the film, we hear stories of different black Germans from various ethnic, cultural, and national backgrounds. Each has a different story to tell about their experience and no two experiences are the same. One of the characters, and African-American writer Darius James, puts it best when he says: “one of the things I was very much interested in when I moved here was the diversity of black people. In the united states, or at least in the northeast, there’s kind of this monolithic idea of black identity in terms of how you define a black person, a notion that’s completely false, erroneous, not true. Black people come from everywhere, they are everywhere.”

Another central theme in the film is the power the language has and its place in contemporary racial relations. Numerous of the characters describe their relationship to the word "nigger" (and the numerous variations of it) and the power, violence, and terror that comes with that word. They also discuss the racist legacies of nursery rhymes including "Eeny, meeny, miny, moe" and "Zehn Kleine Nergelein", the latter song continually throughout the film. Although the film depicts language being used as a tool for racial violence, the characters also discuss the power in reclaiming and re-appropriating language as Bernie, one of the predominantly English-speaking characters, notes that the word "nigga" can be used as a form of resistance. Rapper and actor Tyron Ricketts when speaking on the term "Afro German" says: "I think the term Afro-German is very important now. Not so much to distinguish oneself from other communities, but to develop an awareness that as a black man in Germany you can still be a German, that you can feel German."

== Cast ==
The film features interviews with Afro-Germans, particular those in the artistic community, who describe their experience as blacks in Germany. It explores how blacks are perceived by themselves and others.

Most notably:

- Darius James – African American author who lives and works in Berlin
- Sam Meffire – former German police officer, known as part of a campaign against xenophobia, works with programs for at-risk Afro-German youth
- Noah Sow – Afro-German writer, artist, anti-racism activist, and founder of "The Brown Mob"
- Vincent Mewanu – Cameroon-born Afro-German historian
- Tyron Ricketts – Austrian-born Afro-German actor and musician
