= Jackie Barrett =

Canadian powerlifter

Personal information
- Full name: John Robert "Jackie" Barrett
- Nationality: Canadian
- Born: April 25, 1974 (age 52) Halifax, Nova Scotia

Sport
- Sport: Men's Powerlifting

Achievements and titles
- Personal bests: Squat: 277.5 kg (2015); Bench Press: 153 kg (2001); Deadlift: 300 kg (2012); Total: 697.5 kg (2015)
Medal record
Men's Powerlifting
Representing Canada
Special Olympics World Summer Games
Gold medal – first place	1999 Raleigh-Durham	Bench Press
Gold medal – first place	1999 Raleigh-Durham	Deadlift
Gold medal – first place	1999 Raleigh-Durham	Double Combination
Gold medal – first place	2007 Shanghai	Squat
Gold medal – first place	2007 Shanghai	Bench Press
Gold medal – first place	2007 Shanghai	Deadlift
Gold medal – first place	2007 Shanghai	Triple Combination
Gold medal – first place	2011 Athens	Squat
Silver medal – second place	2011 Athens	Bench press
Gold medal – first place	2011 Athens	Deadlift
Gold medal – first place	2011 Athens	Triple Combination
Gold medal – first place	2015 Los Angeles	Squat
Silver medal – second place	2015 Los Angeles	Bench press
Gold medal – first place	2015 Los Angeles	Deadlift
Gold medal – first place	2015 Los Angeles	Triple combination
Special Olympics Canada Summer Games
Gold medal – first place	1998 Sudbury, ON	Bench Press
Gold medal – first place	1998 Sudbury, ON	Deadlift
Gold medal – first place	1998 Sudbury, ON	Double Combination
Gold medal – first place	2002 Prince Albert, SK	Bench Press
Gold medal – first place	2002 Prince Albert, SK	Deadlift
Gold medal – first place	2002 Prince Albert, SK	Double Combination
Gold medal – first place	2006 Brandon, MB	Squat
Gold medal – first place	2006 Brandon, MB	Bench Press
Gold medal – first place	2006 Brandon, MB	Deadlift
Gold medal – first place	2006 Brandon, MB	Triple Combination
Gold medal – first place	2006 Brandon, MB	Top Men's Powerlifter
Gold medal – first place	2010 London, ON	Squat
Gold medal – first place	2010 London, ON	Bench Press
Gold medal – first place	2010 London, ON	Deadlift
Gold medal – first place	2010 London, ON	Triple Combination
Gold medal – first place	2014 Vancouver, BC	Squat
Gold medal – first place	2014 Vancouver, BC	Bench Press
Gold medal – first place	2014 Vancouver, BC	Deadlift
Gold medal – first place	2014 Vancouver, BC	Triple Combination
Gold medal – first place	2014 Vancouver, BC	Top Men's Powerlifter

John "Jackie" Barrett, ONL (born April 25, 1974) is a Canadian powerlifter. Barrett, who has autism, has won thirteen gold medals competing for Canada in the Special Olympics World Summer Games and retired after setting three Special Olympics records at the 2015 Special Olympics World Summer Games in Los Angeles.

Jackie is a Halifax, Nova Scotia native residing in Corner Brook, Newfoundland and Labrador.

== Biography ==
John "Jackie" Barrett was raised in Spryfield, a community in the urban core of Halifax. He currently resides in the Corner Brook area.

In 1980, Jackie was diagnosed with autism, a learning disability, and a speech impairment. He gradually regained his ability to talk at age six.

Jackie spent most of his elementary school years in Special Education classes while he gradually normalized his academic and developmental abilities. He was enrolled in a general academic program in Grade 7 and early Grade 8, and a full academic program starting his late Grade 8 year.

At age 13, a family friend suggested that Jackie should be involved with Special Olympics. He decided to join the organization as a Swimmer.

During his high school years, Jackie lifted weights almost daily to help build his speed in Swimming.

At the 1994 Special Olympics Canada Summer Games in Halifax, his Team Nova Scotia Swimming Coaches took him to a Powerlifting competition and was amazed as how much weight they lifted.

Based on his coach's suggestions, Jackie took up Powerlifting in 1995 and retired from Swimming in 1996. He competed in five appearances at the Special Olympics Canada Summer Games, and four appearances at the Special Olympics World Summer Games as a Powerlifter.

During his Special Olympics Powerlifting Career, Jackie has set numerous Nova Scotia, Newfoundland and Labrador, Special Olympics Canada, and Special Olympics World Records.

== Education ==
Jackie has a Grade 12 Academic Diploma from J. L. Ilsley High School, and a Bachelor of Commerce degree from Saint Mary's University.

== Awards and honours ==
Jackie Barrett was Sport Nova Scotia "Individual Male Athlete of the Year" runner-up for 1999–2000 and 2007–2008.

In 2015, Jackie was the first Special Olympian to be a Northern Star Award nominee.

Jackie was named Special Olympics Canada "Male Athlete of the Year" in 2000 and 2015, and "Dr. Frank Hayden Athlete Lifetime Achievement Award" recipient in 2015.

In 2019, Jackie was inducted into the Nova Scotia Sport Hall of Fame, becoming the first Special Olympic Athlete in its history to receive this honour.

On September 1, 2021, Jackie was invested into Order of Newfoundland and Labrador, the first Special Olympian to receive that province's highest civilian honour.

Jackie was officially awarded the Order of Sport, marking induction into Canada's Sports Hall of Fame through a virtual ceremony on October 3, 2021. He was the first Special Olympics athlete and fifth Halifax native to receive Canada's highest permanent sports honour.

On October 22, 2022, Jackie was inducted into the "Newfoundland and Labrador Sports Hall of Fame", becoming the first Special Olympian to be an inductee to three provincial and national "Hall of Fames".
