= Ojiya, Niigata =

Ojiya 小千谷市
- City
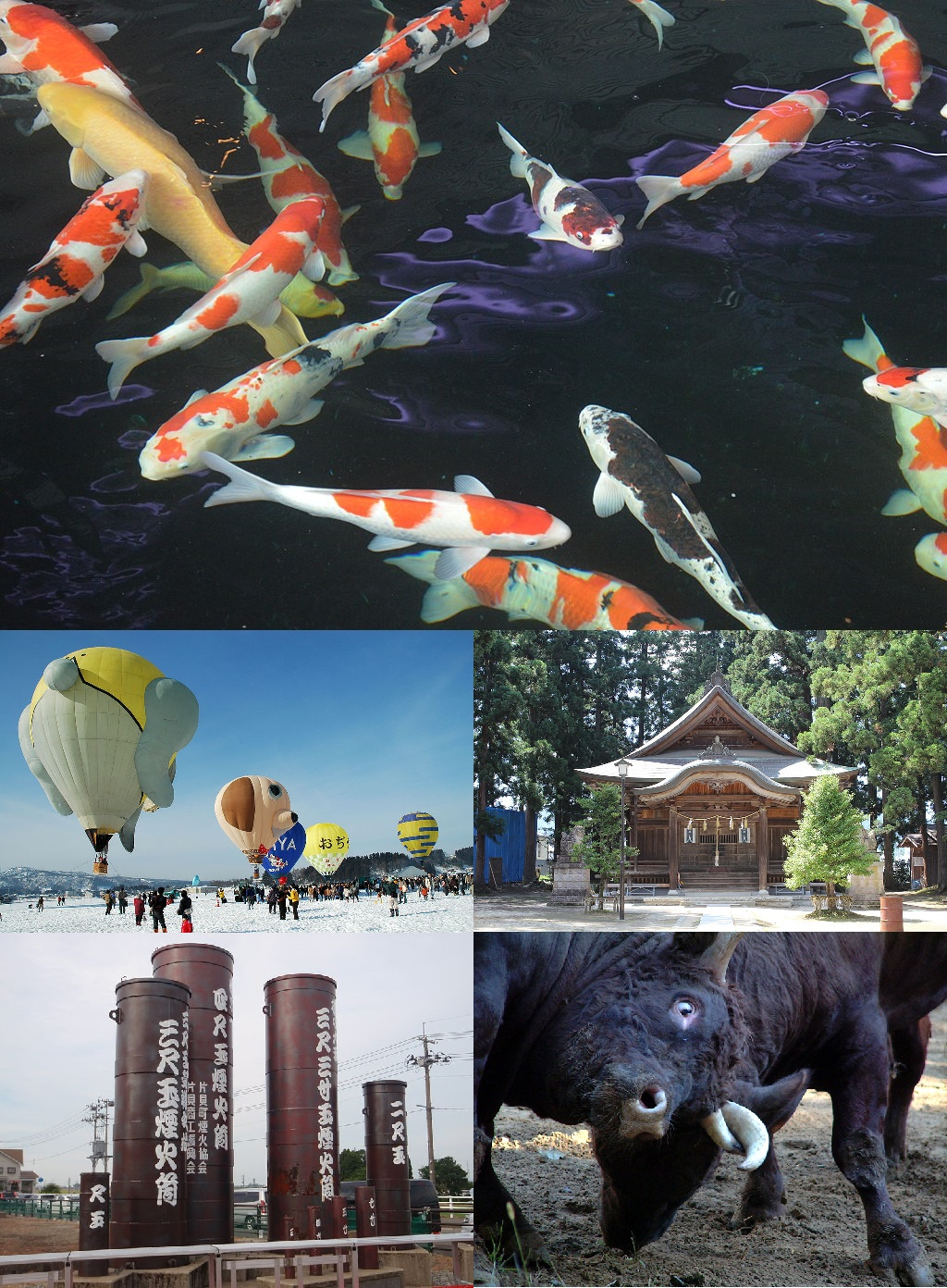
- From top left: Nishikigoi carps in Ojiya Nishikigoi no sato, Ojiya Balloon Revolt, Uonuma Shrine, Katakai Fireworks Festival, Bull Fighting

- Flag Seal

- Location of Ojiya in Niigata

- Coordinates: 37°18′51.7″N 138°47′42.3″E
- Country: Japan
- Region: Chūbu (Kōshin'etsu) (Hokuriku)
- Prefecture: Niigata

Area
  - Total: 155.19 km^{2} (59.92 sq mi)

Population (July 1, 2019)
  - Total: 34,704
  - Density: 223.62/km^{2} (579.18/sq mi)
- Time zone: UTC+9 (Japan Standard Time)
- Symbols
  - Flower: Narcissus
  - Fish: Japanese carp
- Phone number: 0250-62-2510
- Address: 2-7-5 Jonai, Ojiya-shi, Niigata-ken 947-8501
- Website: Official website

Ojiya (小千谷市, Ojiya-shi; Japanese pronunciation: [ó̞.(ɟ̟͡)ì.jä̀, ò̞.(ɟ̟͡)í.jä́.ɕì]) is a city located in Niigata Prefecture, Japan. As of 1 July 2019, the city had an estimated population of 34,704 in 12,758 households, and a population density of 224 persons per km^{2}. The total area of the city was 155.19 square kilometres (59.92 sq mi).

== Geography ==
Ojiya is located in an inland region of central Niigata Prefecture at the southern end of the Echigo Plain. The Shinano River flows through the city. The area has very heavy snow in winter.

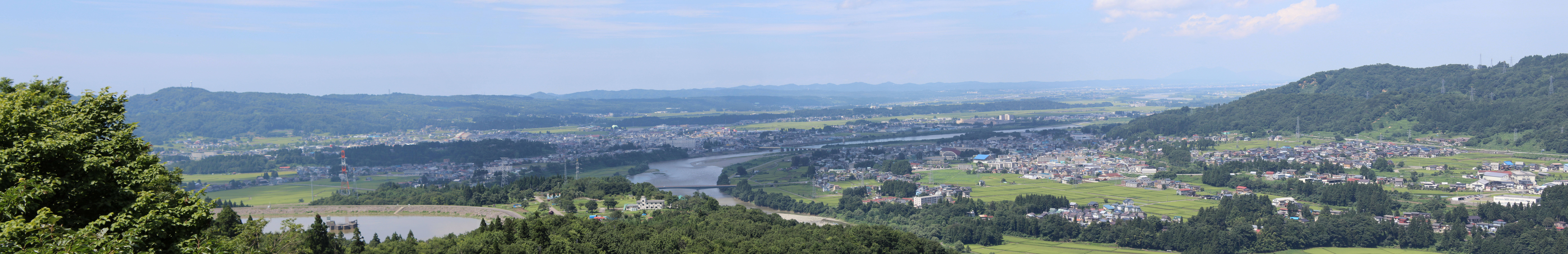
Ojiya city panorama

=== Surrounding municipalities ===
- Niigata Prefecture
  - Nagaoka
  - Tokamachi
  - Uonuma

== Climate ==
Ojiya has a humid subtropical climate (Köppen Cfa) characterized by warm, wet summers and cold winters with heavy snowfall. The average annual temperature in Ojiya is 12.6 °C. The average annual rainfall is 2263 mm with September as the wettest month. The temperatures are highest on average in August, at around 25.8 °C, and lowest in January, at around 0.5 °C.

== Demographics ==
Per Japanese census data, the population of Ojiya has declined over the past 40 years.

Historical population
Year	Pop.	±%
1970	44,581	—
1980	44,963	+0.9%
1990	43,437	−3.4%
2000	41,641	−4.1%
2010	38,600	−7.3%
2020	34,096	−11.7%

== Government ==
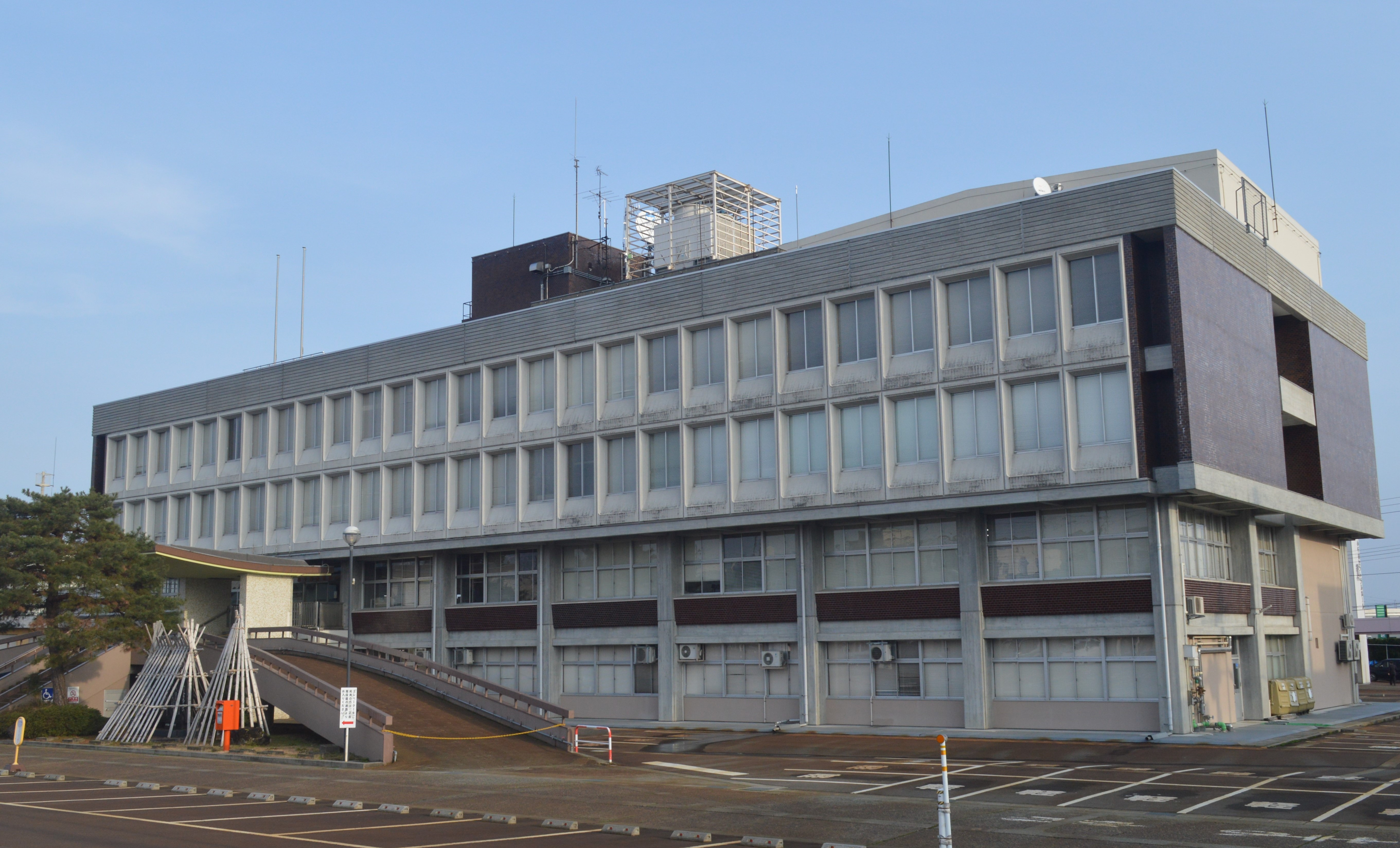
Ojiya City Hall

Ojiya has a mayor-council form of government with a directly elected mayor and a unicameral city legislature of 16 members.

== Economy ==
Ojiya is known as the birthplace of Nishikigoi carps, along with Yamakoshi.

== Transportation ==
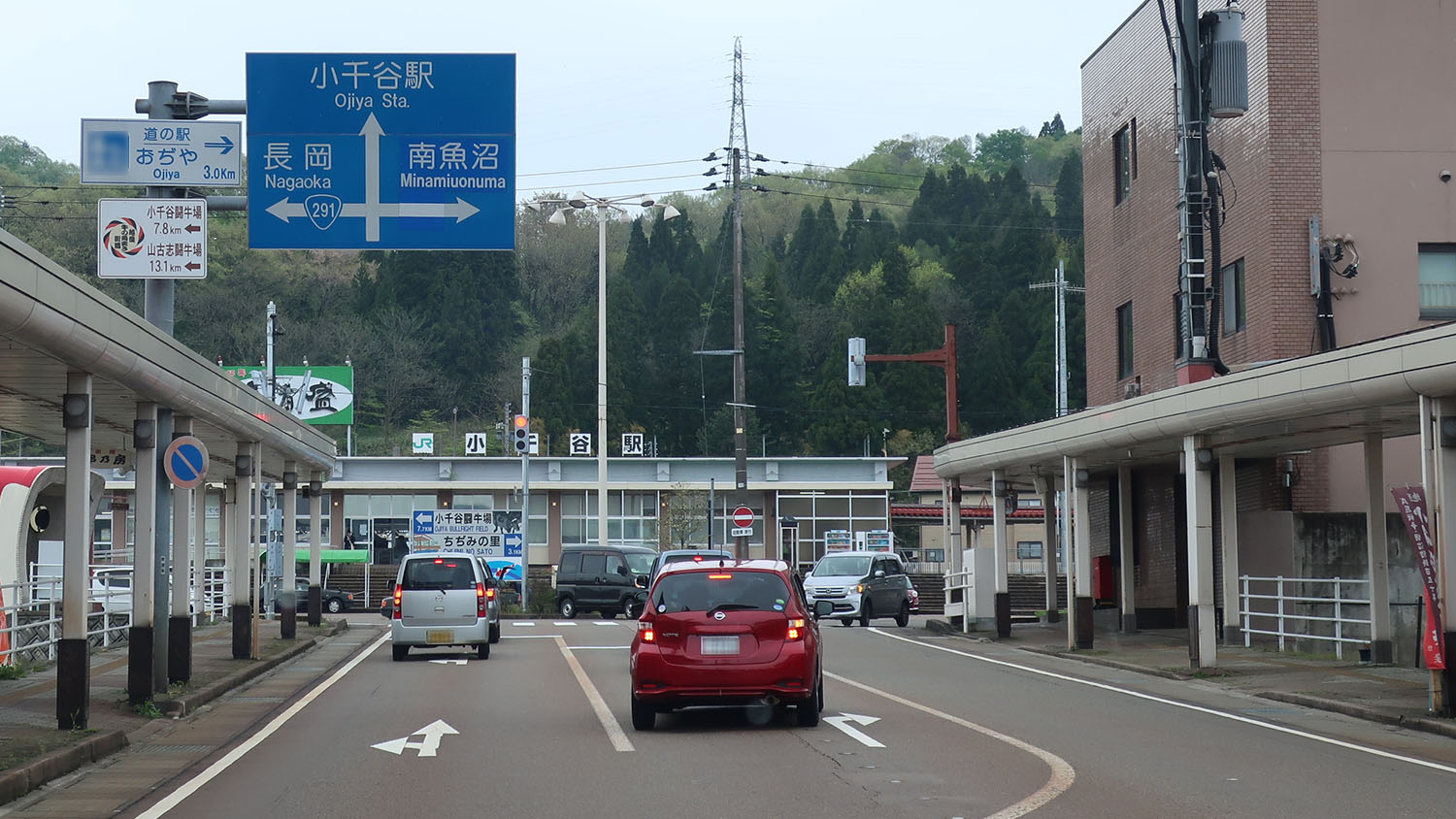
National Route 291 and Ojiya Station

=== Railway ===
- JR East - Iiyama Line
  - Echigo-Iwasawa - Uchigamaki
- JR East - Jōetsu Line
  - Ojiya

=== Highway ===
- Kan-Etsu Expressway – Ojiya IC
- National Route 17
- National Route 117
- National Route 291
- National Route 351
- National Route 403

== Notable people from Ojiya ==
- Uchiyama Gudō, Zen priest and anarcho-socialist activist
- Junzaburō Nishiwaki, poet
- Kazuhiko Torishima, manga magazine editor and publishing executive

== See also ==
- Shiodani Tunnel
