= The Last Words of Dutch Schultz =

1970 closet screenplay by William S. Burroughs

- First edition cover
- Author: William S. Burroughs
- Language: English
- Genre: Biographical
- Publisher: Cape Goliard
- Publication date: 1970
- Publication place: United States
- Media type: Print (Hardcover & Paperback)
- Pages: 81 pp
- ISBN: 0-206-61764-X
- OCLC: 122492
- Dewey Decimal: 791.43/7
- LC Class: PN1997 .B85

The Last Words of Dutch Schultz is a closet screenplay by Beat Generation author William S. Burroughs, first published in 1970.

Based upon the life (or, to be more precise, the death) of 1930s German-Jewish-American gangster Dutch Schultz, the novel uses as its springboard Schultz's surreal last words, which were delivered in the midst of high-fever delirium after being mortally shot while urinating in the men's room of a Newark bar. Phrases such as "French-Canadian bean soup" took on a different meaning for Burroughs as he invented stories to go along with some of the nonsensical statements made by Schultz in his dying hours.

== Structure ==
Despite the title, very little of the screenplay deals with Schultz's cryptic words. Although Burroughs specifies that a recording of Schultz's dying words should be playing throughout the film as the soundtrack, virtually nothing which is actually depicted onscreen has anything to do with the real Schultz's dying monologue. Burroughs creates his own dying words for Schultz to actually speak, and which reflect Burrough's narrative; occasionally, these made-up snippets of speech include Schultz's actual words. Similarly, large segments of the story are told from a third-person perspective, as opposed to being told from Schultz's perspective.

The screenplay is made up of a series of loosely connected vignettes in roughly chronological order. It begins from the point of view of a dying Dutch Schultz, looking up at two police detectives. He has a brief flashback to his own shooting; from there, the movie makes a transition to Schultz's memories of childhood, with the remainder of the movie a series of loosely interconnected vignettes in chronological order depicting Schultz's childhood and rise to power. Occasionally, there are brief, surrealist digressions depicting real events which occurred during Schultz's life (such as the Stock Market Crash), interspersed with equally surreal yet seemingly unrelated digressions involving Burroughs' own fictional characters.

A lengthy segment is dedicated to Schultz hiring a carnival sideshow freak who can hypnotize people by speaking phrases which plant subliminal messages; Burroughs inserts this fictional character into Schultz's legal team during his income tax trials, and credits him with helping Schultz avoid prison time. Burroughs calls for this character, called The Whisperer, to be a motionless man in a chair who speaks without moving his lips, specifying that this should be achieved by the actor's dialogue being recorded into a cassette recorder which is then played behind the actor during filming.

Large segments are dedicated to Burroughs' own creation, "Albert Stern", a morphine addict who randomly appears at intervals throughout Schultz's life and who ultimately attempts to take credit for his murder. Despite no records existing of a contemporary of Schultz named "Albert Stern", a period mugshot appears in the book depicting "Stern"; the mugshot has since been incorrectly identified as Otto Berman. As of 2007, the identity of the boy in the mugshot has not been discerned, although Burroughs' insertion of a photo of himself into the book—ostensibly depicting the police stenographer who transcribed Schultz's last word—indicates that the mugshot might be a prank on Burroughs' part, as it is the only photo in the book not to depict a readily identifiable individual.

Throughout the script, Burroughs calls for a peep booth-style 16mm sex loop—depicting a red haired young man having aggressive intercourse with a Spanish woman in a brass bed—to be played at seemingly random intervals.

== Film adaptation ==
Although there have been occasional reports over the years of filmmakers wanting to adapt Burroughs' story for the screen, to date no one has seriously taken on the project. For a brief period, Dennis Hopper owned the rights to the film, but nothing ever came to fruition. It was filmed as a 2002 Dutch short combining live action and rotoscope animated scenes. The short only features portions of Burroughs' script, with some segments varying slightly from the source material. The film features Rutger Hauer as the voice of Schultz.

== See also ==
- The Illuminatus! Trilogy by Robert Shea and Robert Anton Wilson, which also made extensive use of Schultz's last words.
