= Shiodani Tunnel =

- Location of Ojiya in Niigata
- Interactive map of Shiodani Tunnel

Overview
- Line: Japan Prefectural Route 71
- Location: between Minaminigoro and Ojiya, Niigata
- Coordinates: 37°18′38.5056″N 138°52′36.2598″E
- Status: active

Operation
- Opened: 1983
- Character: Passenger and Freight

Technical
- Line length: 0.512 km (0.318 mi)
- No. of tracks: 2

Shiodani Tunnel (塩谷トンネル (しおだにトンネル), Shiodani ton'neru) is a tunnel on Ojiya-Kawaguchi Yamato line in Japan located in Ojiya city, Niigata prefecture with approximate length of 0.512 km. It was completed and opened in 1983.

== See also ==
- List of tunnels in Japan
- Seikan Tunnel Tappi Shakō Line
- Sakhalin–Hokkaido Tunnel
- Bohai Strait tunnel
