= R. B. More =

Political leader and campaigner

Ramchandra Babaji More
- रामचंद्र बाबाजी मोरे
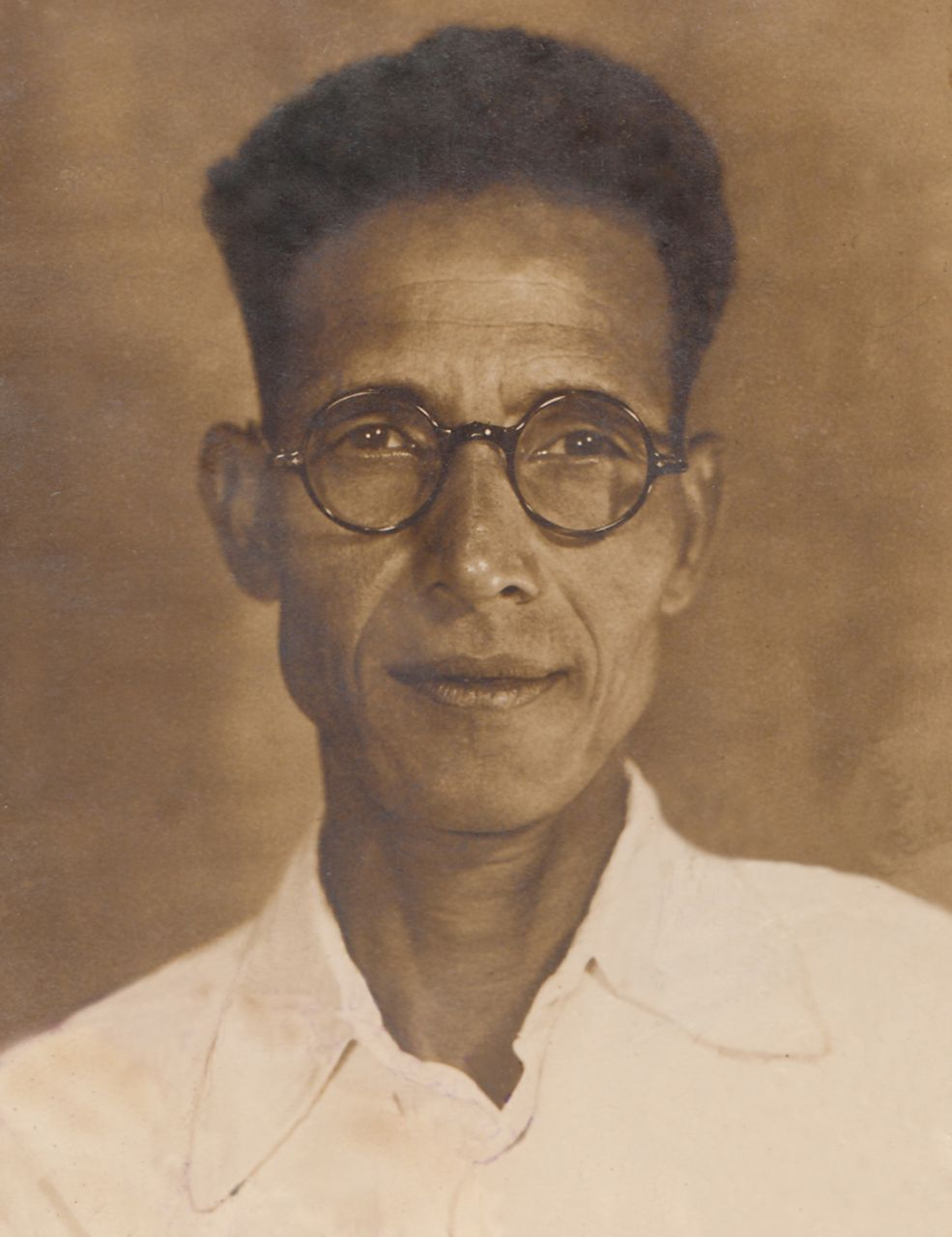
- R. B. More in 1937
- Born: 1 March 1903; Ladavli, Kolaba district, Bombay Presidency, British India (now Raigad district, Maharashtra, India)
- Died: 11 May 1972 (aged 69); Bombay (now Mumbai), Maharashtra, India
- Occupations: Political leader, social reformer
- Known for: Organizing the Mahad Satyagraha (1927); Manusmriti Dahan Din
- Notable work: Founder of Jeevanmarg weekly
- Political party: Communist Party of India (1930-64); Communist Party of India (Marxist) (1964-72)

Ramchandra Babaji More (1 March 1903 – 11 May 1972) was an Indian politician and social reformer who campaigned and advocated against the caste system in India and class exploitation in the Indian subcontinent.

== Early life ==
He was born on 1 March 1903, in a Mahar Dalit family of agricultural workers at Ladavli village in present-day Mahad Tehsil, Raigad district, Maharashtra. At the age of 11, he began his struggle against untouchability. With the aid of some social reformers, he began sending letters to the British government for being denied admission to Mahad High School despite being awarded a scholarship on completing his primary education.

== Political career ==
=== Civil rights campaign ===
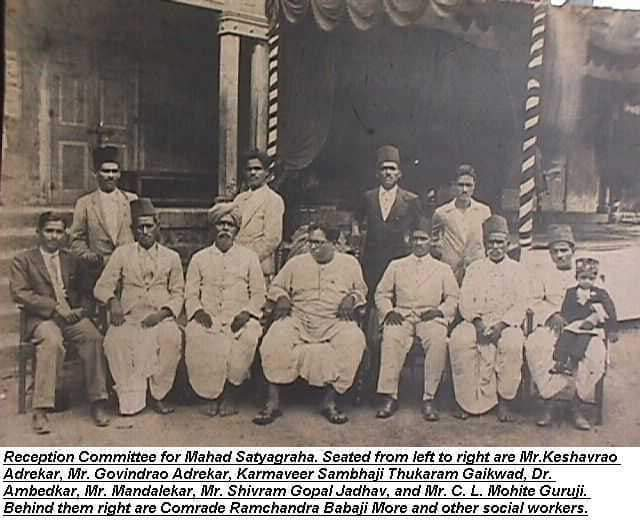
Reception Committee for Mahad Satyagraha

He was the main organizer of Mahad Satyagraha of 19–20 March 1927, which was led by Dr B. R. Ambedkar. More originally wrote a detailed account of Mahad Satyagraha in Marathi. The struggle of Dalits at Mahad for asserting their rights to access the public tank, the Chavadar tank, was arguably the first civil rights struggles in history. R.B. More was also the organizer of another convention at Mahad, Manusmriti Dahan Din (Manusmriti Burning Day), which was also led by Babasaheb Ambedkar. This convention took place on 25–26 December 1927, in which thousands of Dalits gathered together to publicly burn a copy of the Manusmriti. Ambedkar also addressed a separate meeting of Dalit women, as part of the convention at Mahad, asking them to shun social practices that perpetuate inequality.

=== Communist party ===
In spite of the fact that More joined the then Communist Party of India (CPI) in 1930, under the influence of Marxism-Leninism, he and Dr. Ambedkar continued to maintain mutual admiration for each other's work. More consistently raised the issue of caste discrimination prevalent in Indian society at different forums of the CPI. He had sent a specific note on the "Problem of Untouchability and the Caste System" to the leadership of the party before third party congress in 1953. More submitted the note to the Politburo on 23 December 1953 with a request to place it before the forthcoming Party Congress. This note was later revised and sent again in 1957 and 1964. Along with appraising the contribution of Dr. Babasaheb Ambedkar in the struggle for social justice, it emphasized the necessity of taking up issues of caste and social discrimination as an essential ingredient of class struggle. He also participated in the freedom struggle against British and working class movement with great vigor and remained one of the most respected leaders of the Communist Party of India (Marxist) (CPI(M)). He was elected to State Committee of CPI(M) in 1964. He started the weekly meeting, Jeevanmarg, of the CPI(M) Maharashtra state committee on 14 April 1965, the anniversary of Ambedkar's birth.

== Death ==
More died on 11 May 1972 in Goregaon, a suburb in Bombay (now Mumbai), at the age of 69.
