= High Treason Incident =

1910 assassination plot on Emperor Meiji

The High Treason Incident (大逆事件, Taigyaku Jiken), also known as the Kōtoku Incident (幸徳事件, Kōtoku Jiken), was a socialist-anarchist plot to assassinate the Japanese Emperor Meiji in 1910, leading to a mass arrest of leftists, as well as the execution of 12 alleged conspirators in 1911. Another 12 conspirators who were initially condemned to death had their sentences commuted to life in prison. Two others received prison sentences of 8 and 11 years.

== Investigation ==
On 20 May 1910, the police searched the room of Miyashita Takichi (1875–1911), a young lumbermill employee in Nagano Prefecture, and found materials which could be used to construct bombs. Investigating further, the police arrested his accomplices, Nitta Tōru (1880–1911), Niimura Tadao (1887–1911), Furukawa Rikisaku (1884–1911) and Kōtoku Shūsui and his former common-law wife, feminist author Kanno Suga. Upon questioning, the police discovered what the prosecutor's office regarded as a nationwide conspiracy against the Japanese monarchy.

In the subsequent investigation, many known leftists and suspected sympathizers were brought in for questioning around the country. Eventually, 25 men and one woman were brought to trial on the charge of violation of Article 73 of the Criminal Code (harming or intending harm to the Emperor or member of the imperial family). Four of those arrested were Buddhist monks, including Uchiyama Gudō and Takagi Kenmyō. The case was tried in a closed court, and the prosecutor was Hiranuma Kiichirō.

Evidence against the defendants was mainly circumstantial. Nonetheless, twenty-four of the twenty-six defendants were sentenced to death by hanging on 18 January 1911, and the remaining two defendants were sentenced to 8 years and 11 years for violation of explosives ordinances.

Of the death sentences, an Imperial Rescript commuted twelve to life imprisonment on the following day. Of the remaining twelve, eleven were executed on 24 January 1911. These included Shūsui, a prominent Japanese anarchist, Ōishi Seinosuke, a doctor, and Uchiyama Gudō, the only one of the Buddhist monks arrested to be executed. The last of the condemned defendants, the only woman, Kanno Sugako, was executed the next day.

The case was largely used as a pretext by authorities to round up dissidents. Only five or six of those accused and convicted in the trial actually had anything to do with the plot to kill the emperor. Even the foremost defendant, Shūsui, had not been involved in the plot since the very earliest stages, but his high prestige made him the principal figure to the prosecution.

The High Treason Incident is indirectly related to the Red Flag Incident of 1908. During the High Treason investigation, anarchists already incarcerated in the Red Flag Incident were questioned about possible involvement, including Ōsugi Sakae, Sakai Toshihiko, and Yamakawa Hitoshi. Being already in jail saved many from facing further charges. Kanno, who was found not guilty during the Red Flag trials, was arrested, tried, and sentenced to death in the High Treason trials.

== Aftermath ==
The High Treason Incident created a shift in the intellectual environment of the late Meiji period towards more control and heightened repression for ideologies deemed potentially subversive. It is often cited as one of the factors leading to the promulgation of the Peace Preservation Laws.

A plea for a retrial was submitted after the end of the Second World War, but this was turned down by the Supreme Court in 1967.
