= Closet screenplay =

Screenplay read by a person or aloud in a group rather than performed

Related to closet drama, a closet screenplay is a screenplay intended not to be produced/performed but instead to be read by a solitary reader or, sometimes, out loud in a small group.

While any published, or simply read, screenplay might reasonably be considered a "closet screenplay," 20th- and 21st-century Japanese and Western writers have created a handful of film scripts expressly intended to be read rather than produced/performed. This class of prose fiction written in screenplay form is perhaps the most precise example of the closet screenplay.

This genre is sometimes referred to using a romanized Japanese neologism: "Lesescenario (レーゼシナリオ)" or, following Hepburn’s romanization of Japanese, sometimes “Rezeshinario.” A portmanteau of the German word Lesedrama ("read drama") and the English word scenario, this term simply means "closet scenario," or, by extension, "closet screenplay."

== Critical interest ==
Brian Norman, an assistant professor at Idaho State University, refers to James Baldwin's One Day When I Was Lost as a "closet screenplay." The screenplay was written for a project to produce a movie, but the project suffered a setback. After that, the script was published as a literary work.

Lee Jamieson's article "The Lost Prophet of Cinema: The Film Theory of Antonin Artaud" discusses Artaud's three Lesescenarios (listed below) in the context of his "revolutionary film theory." And in French Film Theory and Criticism: 1907–1939, Richard Abel lists the following critical treatments of several of the Surrealist "published scenario texts" (36) listed in the example section below:

- J. H. Matthews, Surrealism and Film (U of Michigan P, 1971), 51–76.
- Steven Kovács, From Enchantment to Rage: The Story of Surrealist Cinema (Associated UP, 1980), 59–61, 157–76.
- Linda Williams, Figures of Desire: A Theory and Analysis of Surrealist Film (U of Illinois P, 1981), 25–33.
- Richard Abel, "Exploring the Discursive Field of the Surrealist Film Scenario Text," Dada/Surrealism 15 (1986): 58–71.

Finally, in his article "Production's 'dubious advantage': Lesescenarios, closet drama, and the (screen)writer's riposte," Quimby Melton outlines the history of the Lesescenario form, situates the genre in a historical literary context by drawing parallels between it and Western "closet drama," and argues we might consider certain instances of closet drama proto-screenplays. The article also argues that writing these sorts of "readerly" performance texts is essentially an act of subversion whereby (screen)writers work in a performance mode only to intentionally bypass production and, thereby, (re)assert narrative representation's textual primacy and (re)claim a direct (re)connection with their audience.

The comments section of Melton's article also has an ongoing discussion of the Lesescenario canon. The list of examples below is based on "Production's 'dubious advantage,'" that discussion, and Melton's "Lesecenario Bibliography" at Google Docs. The bibliography contains additional critical works concerned with individual Lesescenarios and/or the canon at large.

== Examples ==
Alphabetical by author last name. For a full list, please see Melton's aforementioned Google Docs bibliography.

=== A ===
- The House, Man's Fate, Dedication Day (by James Agee)
- Asakusa Park, The Life of a Stupid Man, Shadow, and Temptation (by Ryūnosuke Akutagawa)
- Divine Comedy (by Haruhiko Arai, based on Kyojin Onishi's novel of the same name)
- France America, or the Interrupted Film (by Robert Aron)
- Eighteen Seconds, a screenplay, The Seashell and the Clergyman, Thirty Two, The Solar Plane, Two Nations on the Borders of Mongolia, The Master of Ballantrae (after the Robert Louis Stevenson novel of the same name), Flights, and The Butcher's Revolt (by Antonin Artaud)
- Lost Children (by Marcel Aymé)

=== B ===
- The Reader from Ames (by André Berge)
- The Initiation (A Story of Adventure) (by François Berge)
- Hummingbird – Adventures of a Freshman Girl (by Nora Blake)
- The Second Departure (by Maurice Betz)
- Le Dernier Empereur (by Jean-Richard Bloch)
- Beautiful Weddings in the Street: A New Scenario on a Banal Theme (by Jacques Bonjean)
- One Day, When I Was Lost: A Scenario Based on Alex Haley's The Autobiography of Malcolm X (by James Baldwin)
- "Une Girafe" (by Luis Buñuel)
- Mozart and the Wolf Gang (by Anthony Burgess)
- The Last Words of Dutch Schultz (by William S. Burroughs)

=== C ===
- Secrets on the Island and Arletty, Young Woman from Dauphine (by Louis-Ferdinand Céline)
- The End of the World, Filmed by the Angel of Notre Dame and Atlantis (by Blaise Cendrars)
- A Broken Foot: A Documentary (by Hendrik Cramer)

=== D ===
- "The Reefs of Love," Midnight at Noon: A Study of Marvelous Modernity, and "There Are Bugs in the Roast Pork" (by Robert Desnos)
- Pierre, or The Demon Unmasked (by André Desson and André Harlaire)
- Savoir Vivre (by Jean-Paul Dreyfus and Bernar Lahy-Hollebecque)

=== F ===
- "Eyes Wide Open" ("Paupières mûres"), "Horizontal Bar," and "Mtasipoj" (by Benjamin Fondane)

=== G ===
- News (by Paul Gilson)
- Figures (by Ramon Gomez de la Serna)
- Descent to the Lower Depths (by Maxim Gorky)

=== H ===
- For Rent (Sakutaro Hagiwara)
- Slaughterhouses of the Night (by Maurice Henry)
- The Girl in Harmagedon (by Kazumasa Hirai)
- Ape and Essence (part II: "The Script") (by Aldous Huxley)

=== J ===
- Negrophobia (by Darius James [aka Dr. Snakeskin])

=== K ===
- Lom Long (by Chart Korbjitti)
- The True Story of Ah Q (by Fuyuhiko Kitagawa, based on Lu Xun's novella)

=== L ===
- The Escape of Mr. McKinley (by Leonid Leonov)

=== M ===
- Trial of the warlock (by Norman Mailer, based on " La-bas" by Joris-Karl Huysmans)

=== N ===
- "L'Amazon des cimetières" (by Georges Neveux)

=== O ===
- The Revolutionary Woman (Kenzaburo Oe)
- The Birth of the Emperor/Record of Ancient Matters (by Hideo Osabe)

=== R ===
- Donogoo-Tonka, or The Miracles of Science (by Jules Romains)
- "La Huitème Jour de la semaine" and The Banker, or Fortune is Blind (by Georges Ribemont-Dessaignes)

=== S ===
- The Evening Murder (by Haruo Sato)
- Don't Put a Dog Outside: A Film without Words (by Claude Sernet)

=== T ===
- Whispering Moon, (by Jun'ichirō Tanizaki)
- The Unconquerable People, The Doctor and the Devils, Rebecca's Daughters, The Beach of Falesá, Twenty Years A-Growing, Suffer Little Children, The Shadowless Man, and Me and My Bike (by Dylan Thomas)

=== W ===
- Reality Is What You Can Get Away With and The Walls Came Tumbling Down (by Robert Anton Wilson)

== See also ==
- Fuyuhiko Kitagawa
- cinepoetry
