= Girō Senoo =

Japanese Buddhist Marxist

Girō Senoo (妹尾 義郎, Seno'o Girō; 1890–1961) was a Japanese Nichiren Buddhist and Marxist. He founded the short lived Shinkō Bukkyō Seinen Dōmei (Youth League for Revitalizing Buddhism, 1931–1936). Seno was involved in the political dissidence in the Empire of Japan and founded the Japanese Youth League for Revitalizing Buddhism.

In 1933 he wrote: "I was born into a Shinshu family and brought up in pious nenbutsu surroundings. At twenty-one, though, a grave illness struck and I was forced to leave school. From then until I was thirty, I was literally at the brink of death. Perhaps it is fate that I should be brought back to life by the different outlook of Nichiren. That philosophy has since been for me the sole truth. For twenty and more years I devoted myself to studying and spreading it, so diligently as to forget sleep itself. Though physically still weak, I would push forward to fulfilling the Buddhist calling. However, the result was that I came to question the whole religious establishment itself. I found myself with no other possibility than to oppose it."

== Propagation of Nichirenism ==
In 1918 he joined the nationalistic Kokuchūkai, a Nichiren Buddhist lay-movement founded by Tanaka Chigaku and Honda Nissho. He was put in charge as the editor of the magazine for the "Youth Association of the Great Japanese Nichirenism Movement" which propagated the right-winged reinterpretation of Nichiren's teachings. Ten years later he was influenced by the no-self movement (muga) and began to change his orientation to an ideal of Buddhist socialism.

== Youth League for Revitalizing Buddhism ==
Senoo argued that “the capitalist system generates suffering and, thus, violates the spirit of Buddhism.” He was critical of both orthodox Marxists who denied the importance of spirituality and of pro-war Buddhists who supported Japanese Imperialism. Seno'o saw suffering as something not just to be transcended through spirituality but also an existential material condition to be analyzed and eliminated. Senoo believed in the creation of a “Pure Land” (jōbukkokudo) in this world through new Buddhist socialist ideals which would lead to our spiritual liberation as well as social and economic emancipation (kaihō).

Senoo's new Youth League for Revitalizing Buddhism published a journal, Revitalized Buddhism (Shinkō Bukkyō 新興仏教) and held a yearly national conference. The league was opposed to nationalism, militarism, "Imperial-Way Buddhism", and Japanese Imperialism while promoting internationalism, Buddhist ecumenism and anti-capitalism. The league's manifesto was based on three principles:

1. We resolve to realize the implementation of a Buddha Land in this world, based on the highest character of humanity as revealed in the teachings of Śākyamuni Buddha and in accordance with the principle of brotherly love.
2. We accept that all existing sects, having profaned the Buddhist spirit, exist as mere corpses. We reject these forms, and pledge to enhance Buddhism in the spirit of the new age.
3. We recognize that the present capitalist economic system is in contradiction with the spirit of Buddhism and inhibits the social welfare of the general public. We resolve to reform this system in order to implement a more natural society.

On 7 December 1936 Seno'o was arrested by the government and charged with treason. In 1937 Seno'o confessed his crimes and pledged his loyalty to the Emperor after a five-month interrogation process. He was later released in 1942.

== See also ==
- Buddhist socialism
- Marxism and religion

== Bibliography ==
- Iguchi, Gerald (2006). Nichirenism as Modernism: Imperialism, Fascism, and Buddhism in Modern Japan (Ph.D. Dissertation), University of California, San Diego. (Girō Seno'o and Overcoming Nichirenism pp. 175–230).
- Michiaki Okuyama (2002). "Religious Nationalism in the Modernization Process: State Shinto and Nichirenism in Meiji Japan", Bulletin of the Nanzan Institute for Religion & Culture, 26, pp. 19–31.
- Large, Stephen S. (1987). "Buddhism, Socialism, and Protest in Prewar Japan: The Career of Seno'o Girō." Modern Asian Studies 21 (1): 153-71.
- Shields, James (2012). "Radical Buddhism, Then and Now: Prospects of a Paradox." Silvia Iaponicarum Special Edition: Japan: Challenges in the 21st Century 23–26, 15-34.
