= Uchiyama Gudō =

Zen Buddhist anarcho-socialist (1874–1911)

- 内山 愚童
- Born: May 17, 1874; Ojiya, Niigata, Japan
- Died: January 24, 1911 (aged 36); Ichigaya, Tokyo, Empire of Japan
- Cause of death: Execution by hanging
- Burial place: Rinsenji Temple
- Years active: 1897–1911
- Known for: High Treason Incident
- Religion: Sōtō Zen Buddhism
- Ordained: 1897

Uchiyama Gudō (内山 愚童; May 17, 1874 – January 24, 1911) was a Sōtō Zen Buddhist priest and anarcho-socialist activist executed in the High Treason Incident. He was one of few Buddhist leaders who spoke out against the Meiji government in its imperialist projects. Gudō was an outspoken advocate for redistributive land reform, overturning the Meiji emperor system, encouraging conscripts to desert en masse and advancing democratic rights for all. He criticized Zen leaders who claimed that low social position was justified by karma and who sold abbotships to the highest bidder.

== Biography ==
=== Student, village priest and social activist ===
Uchiyama Gudō learned the trade of carving wooden statues, including Buddhist statues and family altars, from his father. As a student, Uchiyama received a prefectural award for educational excellence and became influenced by Sakura Sōgorō. Uchiyama's father died when he was 16.

Gudō was ordained as a Soto Zen priest in 1897 and became the abbot of Rinsenji temple amid the rural region of the Hakone Mountains in 1904, thus completing his Zen studies. According to town legend, every autumn, he distributed the harvest of the temple's trees to local families, who were generally poor. In the same year that Gudō became abbot of Rinsenji, he reflected on the Chinese sangha of his Buddhist lineage as a model of communal lifestyle without private property. By this time, he had begun to identify as an anarcho-socialist after encountering the ideology in the newspaper Heimin Shimbun. Quoting passages from the Lotus Sutra and the Diamond Sutra in the January 1904 edition of Heimin Shimbun, Gudō wrote:

As a propagator of Buddhism I teach that "all sentient beings have the Buddha nature" and that "within the Dharma there is equality, with neither superior nor inferior". Furthermore, I teach that "all sentient beings are my children". Having taken these golden words as the basis of my faith, I discovered that they are in complete agreement with the principles of socialism. It was thus that I became a believer in socialism.

After government persecution pushed the socialist and anti-war movements in Japan underground, Gudō visited Kōtoku Shūsui in Tokyo in 1908 and purchased equipment which he later used to set up a secret press in his temple. Gudō used the printing equipment to turn out popular socialist tracts and pamphlets and also to publish some of his own work.

One of his most widely read and circulated works was a "scathing denunciation" of the entire government of Japan and its autocratic system: In contrast to the official teachings at the time, he argued that the emperors of the Imperial family were neither divine nor the destined rulers of Japan. Even though their line could be traced back for 2,500 years, their ancestors were not gods but "came forth from a corner of Kyushu, killing and robbing people as they did. They then destroyed their fellow thieves." Furthermore, the emperors had for much of their history "been tormented by foreign opponents and, domestically, treated as puppets by their own vassals." Gudō denounced his country's educated elite, for they were well aware of all this, but preferred to "deceive both others and themselves" by disseminating and teaching the government's official stance of the Imperial family.

=== Imprisonment, trial and execution ===
Resulting from the popularity of Gudō's subversive publications, he was arrested in May 1909 and charged with violating press and publication laws. After searching Rinsenji, police claimed to have encountered materials used to make explosive devices. As a result, Gudō was tied to the High Treason Incident, in which 12 alleged conspirators were convicted and executed for plotting to assassinate the emperor in 1911.

Yoshida Kyūichi records that as Gudō climbed the scaffold stairs, "he gave not the slightest hint of emotional distress. Rather he appeared serene, even cheerful-so much so that the attending prison chaplain bowed as he passed".

=== Deprivation and restoration of priesthood ===
In July 1909, before Gudō's conviction, officials of the Sōtō Zen sect moved to deprive Gudō of his abbotship. After he was convicted, they deprived him of his status as a priest in June 1910. Gudō continued to consider himself a priest until he died.

In 1993, the Sōtō Zen sect restored Gudō's status as a priest citing that "when viewed by today's standards of respect for human rights, Uchiyama Gudō's writings contain elements that should be regarded as farsighted" and that "the sect's actions strongly aligned the sect with an establishment dominated by the emperor system. They were not designed to protect the unique Buddhist character of the sect's priests".

== See also ==
- Japanese resistance to the Empire of Japan in World War II
- Anarchism in Japan
- Buddhist socialism
- Inoue Shūten
