= Fuyuhiko Kitagawa =

Japanese poet and film critic

- 北川 冬彦
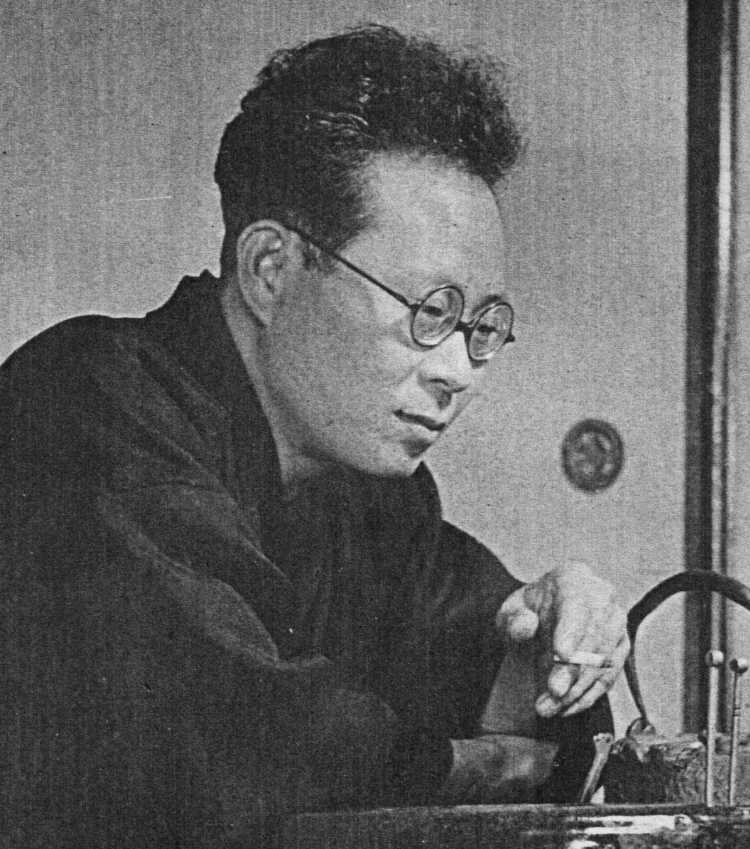
- Fuyuhiko Kitagawa in 1941
- Born: July 3, 1900; Shiga
- Died: April 12, 1990 (aged 89)
- Resting place: Tama Cemetery
- Occupations: Poet, film critic

Fuyuhiko Kitagawa (北川 冬彦, Kitagawa Fuyuhiko) (3 July 1900 – 12 April 1990) was a Japanese poet and film critic. His real name was Tadahiko Taguro (田畔 忠彦, Taguro Tadahiko). While born in Shiga Prefecture, he was raised in Manchukuo in China due to his father's work on the South Manchurian Railway, and then graduated from Tokyo University. He began publishing his own poetry in Manchukuo in 1924 and his work was influenced by that colonial context. His work was praised by Riichi Yokomitsu, and he became a prominent figure in modernist poetry in Japan, pursuing especially prose poetry. Culver describes Kitagawa as instrumental in the early history of Surrealism in Japan through his Japanese translation of Andre Breton's first Manifesto of Surrealism, which appeared in 1929 in Shi to shiron (詩と詩論), nos. 4–5. Kitagawa was also a well-known film critic, one who especially praised the work of Mansaku Itami (the father of Juzo Itami), calling it a new, realistic "prose cinema" (sanbun eiga) in opposition to the old "poetic cinema" (inbun eiga) of Sadao Yamanaka, Daisuke Itō, and others. He was a champion of neorealism in the postwar era.

He was a standard-bearer of the Scenario-Literature-Movement. He, Shuzo Takiguchi, Akira Asano and other members formed a group called 'Ten Scenario-Researchers'. They advocated the movement from a standpoint considering a scenario a literary genre.

== See also ==
- Lesescenario — Kitagawa referred to Lesescenario in his books Reports on Pure Cinema (Junsui Eiga ki 純粋映画記 1936 ) and Charms of Scenarios (Shinario no miryoku シナリオの魅力)
- Motojiro Kajii admired Kitagawa's poetry
- Iku Takenaka
- The True Story of Ah Q: He dramatized it in screenplay form
- Surrealism in Japan
