= Fuyue Anzai =

Japanese poet

Fuyue Anzai (安西 冬衛, Anzai Fuyue; March 9, 1898 – August 24, 1965) was a Japanese poet from Nara Prefecture, Japan. In 1920, he began work in Dalian, China where he developed gangrene and subsequently lost his arm.

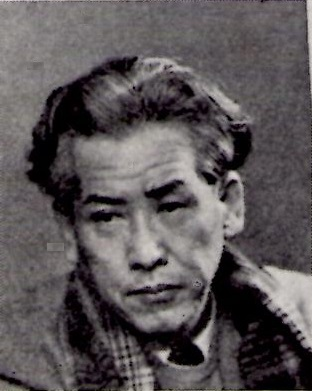
Fuyue Anzai Portrait

Anzai was one of the founding fathers of the magazine Shi To Shiron (or, Poetry and Poetics) and the journal Asia. He published several anthologies, including Gunkan Mari (The Battleship Mari) and Ajia no Kanko (The Asian Salt Lake). Other works by Anzai include: Dattan Kaikyô to Chô (Butterflies and the Mongolian Strait, 1947) and Zaseru Tôgyûshi (The Sitting Matador, 1949).

His second son is Japanese historical psychology author Jiro Anzai (安西二郎).
