= Estonia at the 2000 Summer Paralympics =

- IPC code: EST
- NPC: Estonian Paralympic Committee
- Website: www.paralympic.ee

in Sydney
- Competitors: 10 in 4 sports
- Flag bearer: Helena Silm
- Medals Ranked 45th: Gold 1 Silver 1 Bronze 3 Total 5

Summer Paralympics appearances (overview)
- 1992; 1996; 2000; 2004; 2008; 2012; 2016; 2020; 2024

Other related appearances
- Soviet Union (1988)

Estonia participated in the XI. Summer Paralympic Games in Sydney, Australia. It won 1 gold, 1 silver and 3 bronze medals. Estonian team representatives were president of Estonian Paralympic Committee Toomas Vilosius, Estonian Minister of Social Affairs Eiki Nestor, secretary member Are Eller and coaches Õnne Pollisinski and Rein Põldme.

Estonia entered 10 athletes in the following sports:

- Athletics: 2 females and 2 males
- Sailing: 1 male
- Shooting: 1 male
- Swimming: 4 females

== Medallists ==
Medal	Name	Sport	Event
Gold	Sirly Tiik	Athletics	Women's javelin F20
Silver	Marge Kõrkjas	Swimming	Women's 50m freestyle S12
Bronze	Sirly Tiik	Athletics	Women's high jump F20
Bronze	Sirly Tiik	Athletics	Women's shot put F20
Bronze	Janne Mugame	Swimming	Women's 50m backstroke S14

== Other athletes ==
=== Athletics ===
- Denis Sedelnikov
  - Men's Javelin Throw F20 – Final: 41.44 (→ 4. place )
  - Men's Shot Put F20 – Final: 11.23 (→ 5. place )
- Sergei Dikun
  - Men's 100 m T20 – Semifinal Heat 1: 6th 12,01 (→ did not advance, 17. place )
  - Men's 400 m T20 – Semifinal Heat 1: 6th 55,21 (→ did not advance, 17. place )
  - Men's Long Jump MH – Final: 6.03 (→ 7. place )
- Sirly Tiik
  - Women's High Jump F20 – Final: 1.44 (→ Bronze)
  - Women's Long Jump F42-46 – Final: 4.89 (→ 4. place )
  - Women's Shot Put F20 – Final: 10.34 (→ Bronze)
  - Women's Javelin F20 – Final: 39.77 WR (→ Gold)
- Helena Silm
  - Women's Long Jump F12 – Final: 4.41 (→ 8. place )
  - Women's Pentathlon P13 – Final: 1840 points (→ 7. place )

=== Sailing ===
- Priidik Mentaal
  - Mixed Single Person 2.4mr – 94 points (→ 15. place )

=== Shooting ===
- Helmut Mänd
  - Mixed Air Rifle Prone SH1 – Preliminary: 32nd 593 (→ 32.- 38. place )

=== Swimming ===
- Janne Mugame
  - Women's 50 m Freestyle S14 – Heats: 6th 31,37; Final: 31,25 (→ 8. place )
  - Women's 100 m Freestyle S14 – Heats: 8th 1.08,59; Final: 1.08,96 (→ 8. place )
  - Women's 50 m Backstroke S14 – Heats: 2nd 34,26; Final: 34,02 (→ Bronze)
  - Women's 50 m Butterfly S14 – Heats: 5th 33,79; Final: 33,78 (→ 7. place )
  - Women's 200 m Medley SM14 – Heats: 9th 32.55,78 (→ did not advance, 9. place )
  - Women's 50 m Breaststroke SB14 – Heats: 6th 40,04; Final: 40,14 (→ 6. place )
- Eela Kokk
  - Women's 50 m Freestyle S14 – Heats: 11th 32,89 (→ did not advance, 11. place )
  - Women's 100 m Freestyle S14 – Heats: 9th 1.12,41 (→ did not advance, 9. place )
  - Women's 50 m Backstroke S14 – Heats: 11th 42,45 (→ did not advance, 11. place )
  - Women's 50 m Butterfly S14 – Heats: 11th 35,78 (→ did not advance, 11. place )
- Annika Raide
  - Women's 50 m Freestyle S11 – Heats: 11th 39,46 (→ did not advance, 11. place )
  - Women's 100 m Freestyle S11 – Heats: 12th 1.27,87 (→ did not advance, 12. place )
  - Women's 400 m Freestyle S11 – Heats: 9th 6.38,67 (→ did not advance, 9. place )
  - Women's 100 m Backstroke S11 – Heats: 6th 1.30,50; Final: 1.30,31 (→ 7. place )
- Marge Kõrkjas
  - Women's 50 m Freestyle S12 – Heats: 2nd 30,21; Final: 29,42 ER (→ Silver)
  - Women's 100 m Freestyle S12 – Heats: 3rd 1.06,26; Final: 1.06,38 (→ 6. place )
  - Women's 100 m Backstroke S12 – Final: 1.26,71 (→ 6. place )

== See also ==
- Estonia at the Paralympics
- Estonia at the 2000 Summer Olympics
