= Estonia at the 1996 Summer Paralympics =

- IPC code: EST
- NPC: Estonian Paralympic Committee
- Website: www.paralympic.ee

in Atlanta
- Competitors: 10 in 4 sports
- Medals Ranked 32nd: Gold 3 Silver 4 Bronze 2 Total 9

Summer Paralympics appearances (overview)
- 1992; 1996; 2000; 2004; 2008; 2012; 2016; 2020; 2024

Other related appearances
- Soviet Union (1988)

Estonia participated in the X Summer Paralympic Games in Atlanta, United States. Estonian team representatives were Estonian Paralympic Committee president and Estonian Minister of Social Affairs Toomas Vilosius, head secretary Allan Kiil, secretary Maarit Vabrit and coaches Margit Aidla, Mallika Koel, Rein Põldme and Rein Valdru. Only press member was Are Eller.

Estonia entered 10 athletes in the following sports:

- Athletics: 4 female
- Powerlifting: 1 male
- Shooting: 1 male
- Swimming: 4 female

== Medallists ==
Medal	Name	Sport	Event	Reference
Gold	Annely Ojastu	Athletics	Women's 100m T42-46	
Gold	Marge Kõrkjas	Swimming	Women's 50m freestyle B2	
Gold	Marge Kõrkjas	Swimming	Women's 100m freestyle B2	
Silver	Annely Ojastu	Athletics	Women's 200m T42-46	
Silver	Annely Ojastu	Athletics	Women's long jump F42-46	
Silver	Eela Kokk	Swimming	Women's 50m freestyle MH	
Silver	Marge Kõrkjas	Swimming	Women's 100m backstroke B2	
Bronze	Malle Juhkam	Athletics	Women's long jump MH	
Bronze	Helena Silm	Athletics	Women's pentathlon P10-12	

== Top 6 Finishes ==
=== 4th place ===
- Helena Silm – Athletics, Women's Long Jump F10-11

=== 5th place ===
- Heli Kollom – Athletics, Women's Long Jump MH
- Eela Kokk – Swimming, Women's 100 m Freestyle MH
- Nadežda Maksimova – Swimming, Women's 100 m Breaststroke B3
- Nadežda Maksimova – Swimming, Women's 100 m Freestyle B3

=== 6th place ===
- Nadežda Maksimova – Swimming, Women's 50 m Freestyle B3
- Annika Raide – Swimming, Women's 100 m Freestyle B1

== Results by event ==
=== Athletics ===
- Malle Juhkam
  - Women's Long Jump MH – Final: 4.76 (→ Bronze Medal )
- Heli Kollom
  - Women's Long Jump MH – Final: 4.69 (→ 5. place )
- Annely Ojastu
  - Women's 100 m T42-46 – Semifinal Heats: 4th 12,96; Final: 12,78 (→ Gold Medal )
  - Women's 200 m T42-46 – Final: 26,26 (→ Silver Medal )
  - Women's Long Jump F42-46 – Final: 5.37 m (→ Silver Medal )
- Helena Silm
  - Women's 200 m T11 Semifinal Heat 1: dns (→ no ranking )
  - Women's Long Jump F10-11 – Final: 4.92m (→ 6. place )
  - Women's Pentathlon P10-12 – Final: 2713 pts (→ Bronze Medal )

=== Powerlifting ===
- Vassili Artamonov
  - Men's Up To 56 kg (→ nmr, no ranking )

=== Shooting ===
- Helmut Mänd
  - Men's Air Rifle 3x40 SH1 – Preliminary: 26th 1132 (→ 26. place )
  - Mixed Air Rifle Prone SH1 – Preliminary: 23rd 592 (→ 23. place )

=== Swimming ===
- Nadežda Maksimova
  - Women's 50 m Freestyle B3 – Final: 32,05 (→ 6. place )
  - Women's 100 m Freestyle B3 – Final: 1.10,55 (→ 5. place )
  - Women's 100 m Breaststroke B3 – Final: 1.35,16 (→ 5. place )
  - Women's 200 m Medley B3 – Final: dq (→ no ranking )
- Eela Kokk
  - Women's 50 m Freestyle MH – Heats: 2nd 33,01 Final: 33,14 (→ Silver Medal )
  - Women's 100 m Freestyle MH – Heats: 6th 1.14,66; Final: 1.13,25 (→ 6. place )
- Annika Raide
  - Women's 50 m Freestyle B1 – Heats: 11th 39,46 (→ did not advance )
  - Women's 100 m Freestyle B1 – Heats: 8th 1.24,31; Final: 1.23,26 (→ 6. place )
  - Women's 100 m Backstroke B1 – Heats: 7th 1.32,09; Final: dq
- Marge Kõrkjas
  - Women's 50 m Freestyle B2 – Heats: 1st 30,35; Final: 29,90 (→ Gold Medal )
  - Women's 100 m Freestyle B2 – Heats: 1st 1.09,12; Final: 1.07,43 (→ Gold Medal )
  - Women's 100 m Backstroke B2 – Final: 1.22,43 (→ Silver Medal )

== See also ==
- 1996 Summer Paralympics
- Estonia at the Paralympics
- Estonia at the 1996 Summer Olympics
