= Estonia at the Paralympics =

- IPC code: EST
- NPC: Estonian Paralympic Committee
- Website: www.paralympic.ee
- Medals: Gold 4 Silver 8 Bronze 8 Total 20

Summer appearances
- 1992; 1996; 2000; 2004; 2008; 2012; 2016; 2020; 2024

Winter appearances
- 1992; 1994; 1998; 2002; 2006–2018; 2022

Other related appearances
- Soviet Union (1988)

Estonia have competed at the Paralympic Games since the 1992 Summer events. Estonian Paralympic Committee was founded in April 1991. Best athlete Marge Kõrkjas has performed in four Paralympics and won always at least one medal, total of 7 (2 Gold, 4 Silver and 1 Bronze). The two other gold medalists are Annely Ojastu and Sirly Tiik.

== Medal tallies ==
=== Summer Paralympics ===
Event	**Gold**	**Silver**	**Bronze**	Total	Ranking	Athletes
1992 Summer Paralympics	0	2	1	3	44th	6
1996 Summer Paralympics	**3**	**4**	2	**9**	32nd	10
2000 Summer Paralympics	1	1	**3**	5	45th	10
2004 Summer Paralympics	0	1	0	1	66th	6
2008 Summer Paralympics	0	0	1	1	69th	3
2012 Summer Paralympics	0	0	0	0	-	3
2016 Summer Paralympics	0	0	0	0	-	6
2020 Summer Paralympics	0	0	0	0	-	5
2024 Summer Paralympics	0	0	0	0	-	5
**Total**	**4**	**8**	**7**	**19**		

Best performances in bold.

=== Winter Paralympics ===
Event	**Gold**	**Silver**	**Bronze**	Total	Ranking	Athletes
1992 Winter Paralympics	0	0	0	0	-	1
1994 Winter Paralympics	0	0	**1**	**1**	22nd of 31	13
1998 Winter Paralympics	0	0	0	0	-	16
2002 Winter Paralympics	0	0	0	0	-	13
2006 Winter Paralympics	Did not compete					
2010 Winter Paralympics	Did not compete					
2014 Winter Paralympics	Did not compete					
2018 Winter Paralympics	Did not compete					
2022 Winter Paralympics	TBA					
**Total**	0	0	**1**	**1**		

Best performances in bold.

== Medallists ==
=== Summer Games ===
Medal	Name	Games	Sport	Event
Silver	Annely Ojastu	1992 Barcelona	Athletics	Women's 100m T24
Silver	Marge Kõrkjas	1992 Barcelona	Swimming	Women's 50m freestyle B2
Bronze	Marge Kõrkjas	1992 Barcelona	Swimming	Women's 100m freestyle B2
Gold	Annely Ojastu	1996 Atlanta	Athletics	Women's 100m T42-46
Gold	Marge Kõrkjas	1996 Atlanta	Swimming	Women's 50m freestyle B2
Gold	Marge Kõrkjas	1996 Atlanta	Swimming	Women's 100m freestyle B2
Silver	Annely Ojastu	1996 Atlanta	Athletics	Women's 200m T42-46
Silver	Annely Ojastu	1996 Atlanta	Athletics	Women's long jump F42-46
Silver	Eela Kokk	1996 Atlanta	Swimming	Women's 50m freestyle MH
Silver	Marge Kõrkjas	1996 Atlanta	Swimming	Women's 100m backstroke B2
Bronze	Malle Juhkam	1996 Atlanta	Athletics	Women's long jump MH
Bronze	Helena Silm	1996 Atlanta	Athletics	Women's pentathlon P10-12
Gold	Sirly Tiik	2000 Sydney	Athletics	Women's javelin F20
Silver	Marge Kõrkjas	2000 Sydney	Swimming	Women's 50m freestyle S12
Bronze	Sirly Tiik	2000 Sydney	Athletics	Women's high jump F20
Bronze	Sirly Tiik	2000 Sydney	Athletics	Women's shot put F20
Bronze	Janne Mugame	2000 Sydney	Swimming	Women's 50m backstroke S14
Silver	Marge Kõrkjas	2004 Athens	Swimming	Women's 50m freestyle S12
Bronze	Kardo Ploomipuu	2008 Beijing	Swimming	Men's 100m backstroke S10

=== Winter Games ===
Medal	Name	Games	Sport	Event
Bronze	Vilma Nugis	1994 Lillehammer	Cross-country skiing	Women's 5km free technique B3

== See also ==
- Estonia at the Olympics
- Estonia at the Special Olympics World Games
