= Estonia at the 1998 Winter Paralympics =

- IPC code: EST
- NPC: Estonian Paralympic Committee
- Website: www.paralympic.ee

in Nagano
- Competitors: 16 in 3 sports
- Flag bearer: Vilma Nugis
- Medals Ranked 22nd: Gold 0 Silver 0 Bronze 0 Total 0

Winter Paralympics appearances (overview)
- 1992; 1994; 1998; 2002; 2006–2018; 2022; 2026

Other related appearances
- Soviet Union (1988)

Estonia participated in The VII. Winter Paralympic Games in Nagano, Japan. Estonian flag bearer at the opening ceremony was Vilma Nugis.

Estonia entered 16 athletes in the following sports:

- Biathlon and Cross-country skiing: 2 females and 2 males
- Ice sledge hockey: 12 males
- Ice sledge speed racing

== The 1998 Estonian Paralympic Team ==
Estonian delegation – 16 athletes and 9 officials: Estonian Paralympic Committee president Toomas Vilosius, delegation leader Allan Kiil, team manager Maarit Vabrit, press representative Are Eller, sledge hockey referee Aleksandr Pavlovski, massage therapist Vladimir Sinenki and coaches Külli Hallik, Tõnu Kinks and Eduard Šedasev.

Biathlon

- Vilma Nugis

Cross-country skiing

- Velory Kais
- Taisto Sillamägi
- Vilma Nugis
- Sabina Treial

Ice sledge hockey: Team Roster: 12 men

Name, no, club, position, goals

- Viktor Karlenko – SK Ordo Narva
- Viktor Artemjev – SK Ordo Narva, Defenceman
- Vjatšeslav Vassiljev
- Raul Sas – Net Minder
- Maksim Vedernikov – HC Panter Tallinn, Forward
- Leonid Zubov – SK Ordo Narva, Forward
- Kaido Kalm – HC Panter Tallinn, Center, Captain
- Jüri Tammleht – HC Panter Tallinn, Center
- Arvo Kelement – Defenceman
- Arvi Piirioja – HC Panter Tallinn, Forward
- Anatoli Ajupov – SK Ordo Narva
- Aleksandr Jarlõkov – HC Panter Tallinn, Forward

== Results by event ==
=== Biathlon ===
- Vilma Nugis
  - Women's 7.5 km Free Technique B2-3 – Real time: 41.05,1 (Missed shots: 4) Factor(%): 100; Finish time: 41.05,1 (→ 5. place )

=== Cross-country skiing ===
- Velory Kais
  - Men's 5 km Classical Technique ID – 18.48,2 (→ 10. place )
  - Men's 15 km Free Technique ID – 40.16,8 (→ 21. place )
  - Men's 20 km Classical Technique ID – 1:28.40,0 (→ 12. place )
- Taisto Sillamägi
- Vilma Nugis
  - Women's 5 km Free Technique B2-3 – 19.16,9 (→ 10. place )
  - Women's 5 km Classical Technique B2-3 – (→ dq, no ranking )
  - Women's 15 km Classical Technique B1-3 – 1:09.51,6 (→ 11. place )
- Sabina Treial
  - Women's 5 km Free Technique ID – 23.24,2 (→ 11. place )
  - Women's 5 km Classical Technique ID – 24.35,2 (→ 11. place )
  - Women's 15 km Classical Technique ID – 1:21.45,8 (→ 8. place )

=== Ice sledge speed racing ===
- Jüri Tammleht
  - Men's 100 m LW11 – Finish time: 19,79 (→ 7. place )
  - Men's 500 m LW11 – Finish time: 1.22,79 (→ 7. place )
  - Men's 1000 m LW11 – Finish time: 3.04,57 (→ 8. place )
- Maksim Vedernikov
  - Men's 1,000 m LW11 – Finish time: 2.45,34 (→ 7. place )

=== Ice sledge hockey ===
- Estonian sledge hockey team:
  - Preliminary Group A Round 1: defeated Great Britain 6:0 ( 2:0, 2:0, 2:0 )
  - Preliminary Group A Round 2: lost to Sweden 3:6 ( 0:4, 1:2, 2:0 ) ( 3 goals for Sweden from Jens Kask, who has Estonian roots )
  - Play off semi final game: lost to Norway 1:4 ( 0:1, 0:2, 1:1 )
  - Bronze medal game: lost to Sweden 1:10 ( 1:3, 0:3, 0:4 ) (→ 4. place )

== See also ==
- 1998 Winter Paralympics
- Estonia at the Paralympics
- Estonia at the 1998 Winter Olympics
