= Estonia at the 1992 Summer Paralympics =

- IPC code: EST
- NPC: Estonian Paralympic Committee
- Website: www.paralympic.ee

in Barcelona
- Competitors: 6 in 2 sports
- Flag bearer: Nadežda Maksimova
- Medals Ranked 49th: Gold 0 Silver 2 Bronze 1 Total 3

Summer Paralympics appearances (overview)
- 1992; 1996; 2000; 2004; 2008; 2012; 2016; 2020; 2024

Other related appearances
- Soviet Union (1988)

Estonia participated in the IX. Summer Paralympic Games in Barcelona, Spain. It won 2 silver and 1 bronze medal. The Estonian flag bearer at the opening ceremony was Nadežda Maksimova.

Estonia entered 6 athletes in the following sports:

- Athletics: 2 female and 1 male
- Swimming: 2 female and 1 male

== Medalists ==
	(gold)	(silver)	(bronze)	Total
Estonia	0	2	1	3

=== Silver ===
- Annely Ojastu – Swimming, Women's 100 m TS4
- Marge Kõrkjas – Swimming, Women's 50 m Freestyle B2

=== Bronze ===
- Marge Kõrkjas – Swimming, Women's 100 m Freestyle B2

== Top 8 Finishes ==
=== 4th place ===
- Nadežda Maksimova – Swimming, Women's 400 m Medley B1-3

=== 5th place ===
- Helena Silm – Athletics, Women's Long Jump B3
- Nadežda Maksimova – Swimming, Women's 50 m Freestyle B3
- Nadežda Maksimova – Swimming, Women's 100 m Freestyle B3
- Nadežda Maksimova – Swimming, Women's 100 m Butterfly B2-3
- Nadežda Maksimova – Swimming, Women's 200 m Medley B3
- Marge Kõrkjas – Swimming, Women's 200 m Backstroke B1-2

=== 6th place ===
- Jaan Jensen – Athletics, Men's Shot Put B2
- Jaan Jensen – Athletics, Men's Javelin Throw B2
- Helena Silm – Athletics, Women's 100 m B3
- Marge Kõrkjas – Swimming, Women's 100 m Backstroke B2

=== 7th place ===
- Jaan Jensen – Athletics, Men's Discus Throw B2

== Results by event ==
=== Athletics ===
- Jaan Jensen
  - Men's Discus Throw B2 – Final: 36.54 (→ 7. place )
  - Men's Shot Put B2 – Final: 10.48 (→ 6. place )
  - Men's Javelin Throw B2 – Final: 41.96 (→ 6. place )
- Helena Silm
  - Women's 100 m B3 – Final: 14,00 (→ 6. place )
  - Women's Long Jump B3 – Final: 4.55 (→ 5. place )
- Annely Ojastu
  - Women's 100 m TS4 – Heats: 3rd 13,56; Final: 13,11 (→ Silver Medal )

=== Swimming ===
- Jaak Kotelnikov
  - Men's 50 m Freestyle S8 – Heats: 15th 37,74 (→ did not advance, 15. place )
  - Men's 100 m Freestyle S8 – Heats: 17th 1.24,38 (→ did not advance, 17. place )
  - Men's 200 m Medley SM7 – Heats: 15th 4.14,82 (→ did not advance, 15. place )
- Nadežda Maksimova
  - Women's 50 m Freestyle B3 – Heats: 5th 31,54; Final: 31,12 (→ 5. place )
  - Women's 100 m Freestyle B3 – Heats: 5th 1.09,92; Final: 1.08,75 (→ 5. place )
  - Women's 400 m Freestyle B2-3 – Heats: 9th 5.58,73 (→ did not advance, 9. place )
  - Women's 100 m Butterfly B2-3 – Heats: 5th 1.20,87; Final: 1.20,09 (→ 5. place )
  - Women's 200 m Medley B3 – Final: 3.01,66 (→ 5. place )
  - Women's 400 m Medley B1-3 – Final: 6.34,13 (→ 4. place )
- Marge Kõrkjas
  - Women's 50 m Freestyle B2 – Heats: 2nd 32,25; Final: 31,24 (→ Silver Medal )
  - Women's 100 m Freestyle B2 – Heats: 3rd 1.12,59; Final: 1.10,59 (→ Bronze Medal )
  - Women's 100 m Backstroke B2 – Final: 1.26,46 (→ 6. place )
  - Women's 200 m Backstroke B1-2 – Heats: 5th 3.04,26; Final: 3.04,57 (→ 5. place )

== See also ==
- 1992 Summer Paralympics
- Estonia at the Paralympics
- Estonia at the 1992 Summer Olympics
