= Estonia at the Special Olympics World Games =

Flag of Estonia

Estonia team have competed at the Special Olympics World Games since after regaining independence in 1991 and have won over 100 medals at the games.

== Medal tallies ==
=== Special Olympics World Summer Games ===
Event	**Gold**	**Silver**	**Bronze**	Total	Ranking	Athletes
1991 Special Olympics World Summer Games	2	1				
1995 Special Olympics World Summer Games						
1999 Special Olympics World Summer Games						
2003 Special Olympics World Summer Games	3	1	3	7		7
2007 Special Olympics World Summer Games	4	4	5	13		8
**Estonia Total**				**39**		

Best performances in bold.

==== Gold medalists ====
- 2007 Special Olympics World Summer Games
  - Kalle Noorkõiv: Aquatics (swimming) Division M20 – Men's 100 metre freestyle 2.03,74
  - Anu Säär: Aquatics (swimming) Division F09 – Women's 50 metre freestyle 1.02,85
  - Ragne Kändla: Aquatics (swimming) Division F01 – Women's 100 metre freestyle 1.58,16
  - Viljar Koppel: Athletics/Track & Field Division M19 – Men's 400 metre run 1.12,57
- 2003 Special Olympics World Summer Games
  - Riho Saar: Aquatics (swimming), Age Group: 16- 21, Division M35 – Men's 50 metre freestyle
  - Arvo Sõerd: Athletics/Track & Field – Men's 400 metre run
  - Estonian team (Gristel Markus, Arvo Sõerd, Angela Siim, Taivo Sõts): Athletics/Track & Field – 4x100 metre run
- 1991 Special Olympics World Summer Games
  - Joel Zoova: Athletics/Track & Field

==== Silver medalists ====
- 2007 Special Olympics World Summer Games
  - Viljar Koppel: Athletics/Track & Field Division M09 – Men's long jump 4.26
  - Raivo Laar: Athletics/Track & Field Division M07 – Men's 400 metre Run 1.01,92
  - Marge Vaino: Athletics/Track & Field Division F04 – Women's 800 metre run 2.48,72
  - Marge Vaino: Athletics/Track & Field Division F02 – Women's long jump 3.52
- 2003 Special Olympics World Summer Games
  - Arvo Sõerd: Athletics/Track & Field, Age Group: 8- 11, Division M20 – Men's long jump
- 1995 Special Olympics World Summer Games
  - Andrei Golovin: Powerlifting
- 1991 Special Olympics World Summer Games
  - Arnold Oksmaa: Gymnastics
    - Estonian team (Arnold Oksmaa 2. place Sten Meriväli 4. place): Gymnastics

==== Bronze medalists ====
- 2007 Special Olympics World Summer Games
  - Raivo Laar: Athletics/Track & Field Division M03 – Men's 1500 metre run 5.21,76
  - Jüri Kändla: Aquatics (swimming) Division M02 – Men's 50 metre freestyle 49,88
  - Kalle Noorkõiv: Aquatics (swimming) Division M17 – Men's 50 metre freestyle 43,50
  - Team Estonia (Jüri Kändla, Kalle Noorkõiv, Anu Säär, Ragne Kändla): Aquatics (swimming) Division M4 – 4X25 metre freestyle relay 1.26,78
- 2003 Special Olympics World Summer Games
  - Annika Holtsmann: Aquatics (swimming), Age Group: 16- 21, Division F10 – Women's 50 metre freestyle
  - Angela Siim: Athletics/Track & Field, Age Group: 16- 21, Division F01 – Women's 1500 metre run
  - Taivo Sõts: Athletics/Track & Field, Age Group: 16- 21, Division M01 – Men's shot put

=== Special Olympics World Winter Games ===
Event	**Gold**	**Silver**	**Bronze**	Total	Ranking	Athletes
1993 Special Olympics World Winter Games	0	0	0	0		
1997 Special Olympics World Winter Games	5	7	4	16		8
2001 Special Olympics World Winter Games	10	4	3	17		8
2005 Special Olympics World Winter Games	4	3	1	8		8
**Estonia Total**				**51** (49)		

Best performances in bold.

==== Gold medalists ====
- 2005 Special Olympics World Winter Games
  - Allar Sonn: Cross country skiing – Men's 1 km freestyle
  - Arbo Skobiej: Cross country skiing – Men's 5 km individual
  - Enno Rakojed: Cross country skiing – Men's 5 km freestyle 20.34,50
  - Estonian team (Enno Rakojed, Arbo Skobiej, Raigo Moor, Gustav Rannamets): Cross country skiing – Men's 4x1 km freestyle 16.12,0
- 2001 Special Olympics World Winter Games
  - Jannes Aasorg, Gennadi Grudkin, Airet Lohu, Urmas Simus, Marina Västrik, Eda King, Eerika Sõrmus and Kadi Kurn.
- 1997 Special Olympics World Winter Games
  - Erki Elmik: Cross country skiing – Men's 3 km freestyle
  - Liina Vingel: Cross country skiing – Women's km freestyle
  - Thule Kariste
  - Rainer Danilov

==== Silver medalists ====
- 2005 Special Olympics World Winter Games
  - Sven Paulus: Cross country skiing – Men's 1 km freestyle
  - Gustav Rannamets: Cross country skiing – Men's 3 km freestyle 12.29,60
  - Raigo Moor: Cross country skiing – Men's 5 km freestyle 21.16,00
- 1997 Special Olympics World Winter Games
  - Anu Säär: Cross country skiing – Women's 1 km freestyle
  - Estonian team (Erki Elmik, Marek Sepp, Eiko Hallkivi): Cross country skiing – Men's 3x1 km freestyle

==== Bronze medalists ====
- 2005 Special Olympics World Winter Games
  - Enno Rakojed: Cross country skiing – Men's 3 km freestyle 13.22,70
- 1997 Special Olympics World Winter Games
  - Rene Ridal: Cross country skiing – Men's 1 km freestyle
  - Marek Sepp: Cross country skiing – Men's 3 km freestyle

== See also ==
- President and honorary patron of the Special Olympics Estonia (Estonian: Eesti Eriolümpia)
  - Tõnu Karu – 1989–1997
  - Toomas Hendrik Ilves – 1997–2004 (now Honorary President)
  - Honorary patron since 2004: Jaak Jõerüüt
- Estonia at the Olympics
- Estonia at the Paralympics
