= Estonia at the 2004 Summer Paralympics =

- IPC code: EST
- NPC: Estonian Paralympic Committee
- Website: www.paralympic.ee

in Athens
- Competitors: 6 in 4 sports
- Flag bearer: Helena Kannus
- Medals Ranked 66th: Gold 0 Silver 1 Bronze 0 Total 1

Summer Paralympics appearances (overview)
- 1992; 1996; 2000; 2004; 2008; 2012; 2016; 2020; 2024

Other related appearances
- Soviet Union (1988)

Estonia participated in the XII. Summer Paralympic Games in Athens, Greece. Estonian team representatives were team attaché Estonian Paralympic Committee secretary Liisa Eller, Estonian Paralympic Committee member Are Eller and coaches Kersti Viru, Eric Roots, Heiti Vahtra, Viktor Tkatsenko. Estonian flag bearer at the opening ceremony was Helena Kannus.

Estonia entered 6 athletes in the following sports:

- Athletics: 1 female
- Powerlifting: 1 male
- Shooting: 1 male
- Swimming: 1 female and 2 males

== Medalists ==
Medal	Name	Sport	Event
Silver	Marge Kõrkjas	Swimming	Women's 50m freestyle S12

== Sports ==
=== Athletics ===
Athlete	Class	Event	Final		
Athlete	Class	Event	Result	Points	Rank
Helena Kannus	F12	Long jump	5.03	-	6

=== Powerlifting ===
Athlete	Event	Result	Rank
Aleksandr Koroljov	60kg	DSQ	

=== Shooting ===
Athlete	Event	Qualification		Final		
Athlete	Event	Score	Rank	Score	Total	Rank
Helmut Mand	Mixed 10m air rifle prone SH1	596	22	did not advance		

=== Swimming ===
- Kardo Ploomipuu
  - Men's 100 m Backstroke S10 – Heats: 8th 1.09,80; Final: 1.08,99 (→ 8. place )
- Kristo Ringas
  - Men's 100 m Breaststroke SB13 – Heats: 11th 1.24,15 (→ did not advance, 11. place )
- Marge Kõrkjas
  - Women's 50 m Freestyle S12 – Heats: 2nd 29,28; Final: 28,74 (→ Silver Medal )
  - Women's 100 m Freestyle S12 – Heats: 6th 1.05,86; Final: 1.05,19 (→ 6. place )
  - Women's 100 m Butterfly S12 – Heats: 9th 1.23,91 (→ did not advance, 9. place )

== See also ==
- 2004 Summer Paralympics
- Estonia at the Paralympics
- Estonia at the 2004 Summer Olympics
