= Estonia at the 2002 Winter Paralympics =

- IPC code: EST
- NPC: Estonian Paralympic Committee
- Website: www.paralympic.ee

in Salt Lake City
- Competitors: 13 in 1 sport
- Flag bearer: Kaido Kalm
- Medals Ranked 23rd: Gold 0 Silver 0 Bronze 0 Total 0

Winter Paralympics appearances (overview)
- 1992; 1994; 1998; 2002; 2006–2018; 2022; 2026

Other related appearances
- Soviet Union (1988)

Estonia participated in the VIII Winter Paralympic Games in Salt Lake City, Utah, United States. The Estonian flag bearer at the opening ceremony was Kaido Kalm.

Estonia entered 13 athletes in the following sports:

- Ice sledge hockey: 13 males

== Medalists ==
	(gold)	(silver)	(bronze)	Total
Estonia	0	0	0	0

== The 2002 Estonian Paralympic Team ==
The chef de mission for delegation of the 2002 Estonian Paralympics Team was Allan Kiil (Estonian NPC secretary general) and other officials were president of Estonian Union of Sports for the Disabled Siiri Oviir, Estonian NPC president Toomas Vilosius and executive committee member Are Eller.

Ice sledge hockey: Team roster 13 men

Name, no, club, position, goals

- Kaido Kalm – 16, Tallinn HC Panter, center, captain, 1 goal
- Jüri Tammleht – 12, Tallinn HC Panter, center, 2 goals
- Aleksandr Jarlõkov – 10, Tallinn HC Panter, forward
- Arvi Piirioja – 6, Tallinn HC Panter, forward, 1 goal
- Leonid Zubov – 9, Narva SK Ordo, forward, 1 goal
- Maksim Vedernikov – 13, Tallinn HC Panter, forward, 4 goals
- Imre Tiitsu – 11, Tallinn HC Panter, Forward
- Vladimir Savolainen – 2, Narva SK Ordo, defenceman
- Sergei Vesselov – 3, Narva SK Ordo, defenceman
- Viktor Artemjev – 14, Narva SK Ordo, defenceman
- Andrei Sokolov – 15, Tallinn HC Panter, defenceman
- Vladimir Karandashev – 20, Narva SK Ordo, net minder
- Valeri Falkenberg – 1, Tallinn HC Panter, net minder
- Head coach: Anatoli Zahharov, Narva SK Ordo
- Assistant coach: Olle Sildre
- Trainer: Dr. Gennadi Kuzmin

== Results by event ==
=== Ice sledge hockey ===
==== Preliminary round ====
- Preliminary round 1: lost to Sweden 1:4 (0:1, 0:2, 1:1)
  - 09.48 0:1 Jens Kask (Marcus Holm, Rasmus Isaksson)
  - 17.55 0:2 Marcus Holm (Jens Kask)
  - 18.20 0:3 Jens Kask (Daniel Cederstam, Marcus Holm)
  - 30.37 1:3 Juri Tammleht (Leonid Zubov, Aleksander Jarlokov)
  - 35.36 1:4 Jens Kask (Niklas Ingvarsson)

(Shots on goal: 17–20; penalties: 26-6)

- Preliminary round 2: defeated Japan 2:1 (0:0, 0:1, 2:0)
  - 22.59 0:1 Takayuki Endo – power play
  - 30.23 1:1 Maksim Vedernikov (Leonid Zubov, Arvi Piirioja)
  - 40.41 2:1 Maksim Vedernikov (Aleksandr Jarlokov)

(Shots on goal: 16-13; penalties: 6–16)

- Preliminary round 3: tied Canada 3:3 (2:1, 1:1, 0:1)
  - 11:34 0:1 Billy Bridges (Lou Mulvihill, Todd Nicholson) – power play
  - 11:52 1:1 Arvi Piirioja (Kaido Kalm)
  - 14:25 2:1 Maksim Vedernikov – power play
  - 20:31 2:2 Jean Labonte (Billy Bridges, Todd Nicholson) – power play
  - 21:07 3:2 Leonid Zubov (Maksim Vedernikov)
  - 36:48 3:3 Robert Lagace (Billy Bridges)
  - 42:40 -:- At the 12:40 mark of the third period with the teams tied at 3–3, Estonia broke in 2-on-1 on the Canadian goal. Maksim Vedernikov rushed down the left side and centered a pass for teammate Kaido Kalm, but Kalm collided with a Canadian defender and the puck appeared to deflect into the net before the net was dislodged. After attending to injured Canadian goalie Paul Rosen, referee Morten Marthinsen never signaled a goal, and after a brief delay ordered a faceoff in the Canadian zone. Replays clearly showed the goal should have counted. The following statement was prepared by Alf Inge Andersen, International Paralympic Committee referee-in-chief for the ice sledge hockey tournament: "The referee (Morten Marthisen), situated near the right faceoff circle (to the goalie's left) did not see the puck cross the goal line. His view was obstructed by players. Neither linesman (Gary Cutler and Bob McMann) could see the puck cross the goal line. The referee declared a no-goal situation. Unlike International Ice Hockey Federation rules used in the Olympic hockey tournament, video replay is not approved for use in the Paralympic ice sledge hockey tournament."

(Shots on goal: 18:17; penalties: 36:10)

- Preliminary round 4: lost to Norway 1:6 (0:2, 1:2, 0:2)
  - 01:50 0:1 Helge Bjornstad (Tommy Rovelstad)
  - 14:58 0:2 Helge Bjornstad (Stig Tore Svee)
  - 23:18 0:3 Tommy Rovelstad (Stig Tore Svee)
  - 24:51 1:3 Maksim Vedernikov (Kaido Kalm, Sergei Vesselov)
  - 29:45 1:4 Rolf Einar Pedersen (Helge Bjornstad, Tommy Rovelstad)
  - 36:46 1:5 Atle Haglund (Erik Sandbraaten, Tommy Rovelstad)
  - 42:46 1:6 Stig Tore Svee (Geir Arne Skogstad, Helge Bjornstad)
- Preliminary round 5: lost to United States 1:6 (0:1, 1:1, 0:4)
  - 04.15 0:1 Sylvester Flis (Joe Howard, Kip St. Germaine)
  - 24.42 1:1 Juri Tammleht (Sergei Vesselov)
  - 28.49 1:2 Matt Coppens (Joe Howard, Sylvester Flis)
  - 35.05 1:3 Sylvester Flis (Matt Coppens)
  - 36.35 1:4 Joe Howard
  - 42.30 1:5 Sylvester Flis (Jack Sanders, Joe Howard)
  - 43.08 1:6 Matt Coppens (Sylvester Flis)

(Shots on goal: 13–19; penalties: 10–12)

==== Final round ====
- Final round – classification 5–6 place: lost to Japan 2:6 (0:2, 0:2, 2:2) (→ 6. place)
  - 04:20 0:1 Atsuya Yaguchi (Mamoru Yoshikawa, Naohiko Ishida)
  - 13:41 0:2 Mamoru Yoshikawa (Atsuya Yaguchi)
  - 15:51 0:3 Naohiko Ishida (Mamoru Yoshikawa, Takayuki Endo)
  - 23:27 0:4 Mamoru Yoshikawa (Naohiko Ishida)
  - 32:12 1:4 Kaido Kalm (Juri Tammleht, Maksim Vedernikov)
  - 35:09 1:5 Takayuki Endo (Naohiko Ishida, Mamoru Yoshikawa)
  - 38:26 2:5 Juri Tammleht (Maksim Vedernikov, Kaido Kalm)
  - 43:37 2:6 Taimei Shiba (Kazuhiro Takahashi, Kanichi Naito)

(Shots on goal: 12–27; penalties: 10-10)

== See also ==
- 2002 Winter Paralympics
- Estonia at the Paralympics
- Estonia at the 2002 Winter Olympics
