= Estonia at the 2016 Summer Paralympics =

- IPC code: EST
- NPC: Estonian Paralympic Committee
- Website: www.paralympic.ee

in Rio de Janeiro
- Competitors: 6 in 3 sports
- Flag bearer: Sirly Tiik
- Medals: Gold 0 Silver 0 Bronze 0 Total 0

Summer Paralympics appearances (overview)
- 1992; 1996; 2000; 2004; 2008; 2012; 2016; 2020; 2024

Other related appearances
- Soviet Union (1988)

Estonia competed at the 2016 Summer Paralympics in Rio de Janeiro, Brazil, from 7 September to 18 September 2016. Their top placement was earned by Elizabeth Egel who finished 5th in women's 200 m individual medley SM11.

== Disability classifications ==
Every participant at the Paralympics has their disability grouped into one of five disability categories; amputation, the condition may be congenital or sustained through injury or illness; cerebral palsy; wheelchair athletes, there is often overlap between this and other categories; visual impairment, including blindness; Les autres, any physical disability that does not fall strictly under one of the other categories, for example dwarfism or multiple sclerosis. Each Paralympic sport then has its own classifications, dependent upon the specific physical demands of competition. Events are given a code, made of numbers and letters, describing the type of event and classification of the athletes competing. Some sports, such as athletics, divide athletes by both the category and severity of their disabilities, other sports, for example swimming, group competitors from different categories together, the only separation being based on the severity of the disability.

== Athletics ==
| Athlete | Event | Final | |
| Athlete | Event | Result | Rank |
|---|---|---|---|
| Egert Joesaar | Men's discus throw F44 | 46.61 | 8 |
| Sirly Tiik | Women's shot put F20 | 11.39 | 8 |

== Cycling ==
=== Road ===
| Athlete | Event | Time | Rank |
|---|---|---|---|
| Mari-Liis Juul | Women's road race C5 | 2:35:02 | 15 |
| Mari-Liis Juul | Women's time trial C5 | 32:11.31 | 9 |

== Swimming ==
Men

| Athlete | Events | Heats | | Final | |
| Athlete | Events | Time | Rank | Time | Rank |
|---|---|---|---|---|---|
| Kardo Ploomipuu | 50 m freestyle S10 | 26.08 | 14 | did not advance | |
| Kardo Ploomipuu | 100 m backstroke S10 | 1:03.03 | 9 | did not advance | |

Women

| Athlete | Events | Heats | | Final | |
| Athlete | Events | Time | Rank | Time | Rank |
|---|---|---|---|---|---|
| Brenda Tilk | 50 m freestyle S7 | 38.01 | 10 | did not advance | |
| Brenda Tilk | 100 m freestyle S7 | 1:23.85 | 11 | did not advance | |
| Brenda Tilk | 100 m backstroke S7 | 1:38.99 | 13 | did not advance | |
| Elizabeth Egel | 50 m freestyle S11 | 33.49 | 10 | did not advance | |
| Elizabeth Egel | 100 m backstroke S11 | 1:28.28 | 10 | did not advance | |
| Elizabeth Egel | 200 m individual medley SM11 | 2:56.64 | 4 Q | 2:55.62 | 5 |

== See also ==
- Estonia at the 2016 Summer Olympics
