= Estonia at the 2012 Summer Paralympics =

- IPC code: EST
- NPC: Estonian Paralympic Committee
- Website: www.paralympic.ee

in London
- Competitors: 3 in 2 sports
- Medals: Gold 0 Silver 0 Bronze 0 Total 0

Summer Paralympics appearances (overview)
- 1992; 1996; 2000; 2004; 2008; 2012; 2016; 2020; 2024

Other related appearances
- Soviet Union (1988)

Estonia competed at the 2012 Summer Paralympics in London, United Kingdom from August 29 to September 9, 2012.

== Athletics ==
Men’s Field Events

Athlete	Event	Distance	Rank
Juri Bergmann	Shot Put F20	12.09	9

Women’s Field Events

Athlete	Event	Distance	Rank
Sirly Tiik	Shot Put F20	11.54	5

== Swimming ==
Men

Athletes	Event	Heat		Final	
Athletes	Event	Time	Rank	Time	Rank
Kardo Ploomipuu	50m freestyle S10	26.50	18	did not advance	
Kardo Ploomipuu	100m backstroke S10	1:02.36	5 Q	1:01.32	4

== See also ==
- Estonia at the 2012 Summer Olympics
