= Estonia at the 2008 Summer Paralympics =

- IPC code: EST
- NPC: Estonian Paralympic Committee
- Website: www.paralympic.ee

in Beijing
- Competitors: 3 in 2 sports
- Flag bearer: Kristo Ringas
- Officials: Are Eller, Liisa Eller, VIP Evelin Ilves
- Medals Ranked 69th: Gold 0 Silver 0 Bronze 1 Total 1

Summer Paralympics appearances (overview)
- 1992; 1996; 2000; 2004; 2008; 2012; 2016; 2020; 2024

Other related appearances
- Soviet Union (1988)

Estonia competed at the 2008 Summer Paralympics in Beijing, People's Republic of China.

== Medallists ==
Medal	Name	Sport	Event	Date
Bronze	Kardo Ploomipuu	Swimming	Men's 100m backstroke S10	13 September

== Sports ==
=== Shooting ===
Athlete	Event	Qualification		Final		
Athlete	Event	Score	Rank	Score	Total	Rank
Helmut Mand	Mixed 10m air rifle prone SH1	594	32	did not advance		
Helmut Mand	Mixed 50m rifle prone SH1	563	41	did not advance		

=== Swimming ===
==== Men ====
Athlete	Class	Event	Heats		Final	
Athlete	Class	Event	Result	Rank	Result	Rank
Kardo Ploomipuu	S10	100m backstroke	1:04.52	6 Q	1:03.37	3rd place, bronze medalist(s)
Kristo Ringas	SB13	100m breaststroke	1:15.39	12	did not advance	

== Missing athletes ==
- Athletics: Endre Varik (Men's: Long jump, 100 m) did not compete.
- Swimming: Einar Niin and Keit Jaanimägi did not compete.

== See also ==
- Estonia at the Paralympics
- Estonia at the 2008 Summer Olympics
