= Swimming at the 2012 Summer Paralympics – Men's 100 metre backstroke S10 =

Event at the 2012 Summer Paralympics

Men's 100m Backstroke S10 at the XIV Paralympic Games
- Venue: London Aquatics Centre
- Dates: 4 September 2012
- Competitors: 17 from 13 nations
- Winning time: 1:00.01

Medalists
1st place, gold medalist(s)		Justin Zook	United States
2nd place, silver medalist(s)		André Brasil	Brazil
3rd place, bronze medalist(s)		Benoît Huot	Canada

The men's 100m backstroke S10 event at the 2012 Summer Paralympics took place at the London Aquatics Centre on 4 September. There were three heats; the swimmers with the eight fastest times advanced to the final.

== Results ==
=== Heats ===
Competed from 10:35.

==== Heat 1 ====
Rank	Lane	Name	Nationality	Time	Notes
1	4	Benoît Huot	Canada	1:02.22	Q
2	5	Andrew Pasterfield	Australia	1:02.94	Q
3	3	Dalton Herendeen	United States	1:04.89	
4	6	Filip Coufal	Czech Republic	1:06.05	
5	2	James Hollis	Great Britain	1:06.40	

==== Heat 2 ====
Rank	Lane	Name	Nationality	Time	Notes
1	4	Justin Zook	United States	1:01.11	Q, PR
2	5	Michael Anderson	Australia	1:01.21	Q, OC
3	3	Lucas Ludwig	Germany	1:02.96	Q
4	6	Janis Plotnieks	Latvia	1:03.82	Q
5	2	Lasse Winther Andersen	Denmark	1:06.41	
6	7	Gonzalo Dutra	Uruguay	1:11.42	

==== Heat 3 ====
Rank	Lane	Name	Nationality	Time	Notes
1	4	André Brasil	Brazil	1:01.38	Q
2	5	Kardo Ploomipuu	Estonia	1:02.36	Q
3	3	Maksym Isaiev	Ukraine	1:03.92	
4	6	Sven Decaesstecker	Belgium	1:04.63	
5	2	Isaac Bouckley	Canada	1:06.74	
6	7	Jack Bridge	Great Britain	1:09.38	

=== Final ===
Competed at 18:35.

Rank	Lane	Name	Nationality	Time	Notes
1st place, gold medalist(s)	4	Justin Zook	United States	1:00.01	WR
2nd place, silver medalist(s)	3	André Brasil	Brazil	1:00.11	
3rd place, bronze medalist(s)	6	Benoît Huot	Canada	1:00.73	
4	2	Kardo Ploomipuu	Estonia	1:01.32	
5	5	Michael Anderson	Australia	1:01.40	
6	1	Lucas Ludwig	Germany	1:02.05	
7	7	Andrew Pasterfield	Australia	1:02.84	
8	8	Janis Plotnieks	Latvia	1:04.00	

Q = qualified for final. WR = World Record. PR = Paralympic Record. OC = Oceania Record.
