= Estonia at the 1992 Winter Paralympics =

- IPC code: EST
- NPC: Estonian Paralympic Committee
- Website: www.paralympic.ee

in Tignes-Albertville
- Competitors: 1 in 1 sport
- Medals Ranked 20th: Gold 0 Silver 0 Bronze 0 Total 0

Winter Paralympics appearances (overview)
- 1992; 1994; 1998; 2002; 2006–2018; 2022; 2026

Other related appearances
- Soviet Union (1988)

Estonia participated in The V. Winter Paralympic Games in Tignes-Albertville, France.

Estonia entered 1 athlete in the following sports:

- Cross-country skiing: 1 female

== Medalists ==
	(gold)	(silver)	(bronze)	Total
Estonia	0	0	0	0

== The 1992 Estonian Paralympic Team ==
Cross-country skiing

- Vilma Nugis

== Results by event ==
=== Cross-country skiing ===
- Vilma Nugis
  - Women's Short Distance 5 km B2-3 – Finish time: 19.58,9 (→ 5. place )
  - Women's Long Distance 10 km B2-3 – Finish time: 54.51,8 (→ 5. place )

== See also ==
- 1992 Winter Paralympics
- Estonia at the Paralympics
- Estonia at the 1992 Winter Olympics
