= Estonia at the 1994 Winter Paralympics =

- IPC code: EST
- NPC: Estonian Paralympic Committee
- Website: www.paralympic.ee

in Lillehammer
- Competitors: 13 in 3 sports
- Medals Ranked 22nd: Gold 0 Silver 0 Bronze 1 Total 1

Winter Paralympics appearances (overview)
- 1992; 1994; 1998; 2002; 2006–2018; 2022; 2026

Other related appearances
- Soviet Union (1988)

Estonia participated in The VI. Winter Paralympic Games in Lillehammer, Norway. It won 1 bronze medal.

Estonia entered 13 athletes in the following sports:

- Biathlon and Cross-country skiing: 1 male and 1 female
- Ice sledge hockey: 9 males
- Ice sledge speed racing: 1 male and 1 female

== Medalists ==
	(gold)	(silver)	(bronze)	Total
Estonia	0	0	1	1

=== Bronze ===
- Vilma Nugis — Cross-country skiing, Women's 5 km Free Technique B3

== The 1994 Estonian Paralympic Team ==
Biathlon

- Ants Palopääl
- Vilma Nugis

Cross-country skiing

- Ants Palopääl
- Vilma Nugis

Ice sledge speed racing

- Aivar Kink
- Alja Kivi

Ice sledge hockey: Team Roster 9 men

Name, no, position, goals

- Vjatšeslav Vassiljev
- Jüri Tammleht – 12, Center
- Eduard Semjonov
- Raul Sas – Net Minder
- Jaak Pihlakas
- Tarmo Pärnapuu
- Arvo Kelement
- Viktor Karlenko
- Leonid Zubov – 9, Forward

== Results by event ==
=== Biathlon ===
- Vilma Nugis
  - Women's 7.5 km Free Technique B1-3 – Real time:38.01,0 (Missed shots: 8) Factor(%): 100; Finish time: 38.01,0(→ 7. place )
- Ants Palopääl
  - Men's 7.5 km Free Technique B3 – Real time:34.22,3 (Missed shots: 8) Factor(%): 100; Finish time: 34.22,3 (→ 10. place )

=== Cross-country skiing ===
- Ants Palopääl
  - Men's 5 km Classical Technique B3 – Finish time: 16.26,9 (→ 10. place )
  - Men's 10 km Free Technique B3 – Finish time: 29.09,9 (→ 9. place )
  - Men's 20 km Classical Technique B3 – Finish time: 1:09.03,5 (→ 13. place )
- Vilma Nugis
  - Women's 5 km Free Technique B3 – Finish time: 16.47,0 (→ Bronze Medal )
  - Women's 5 km Classical Technique B3 – Finish time: 18.32,0 (→ 4. place )
  - Women's 10 km Classical Technique B3 – Finish time: 54.55,4 (→ 4. place )

=== Ice sledge speed racing ===
- Aivar Kink
  - Men's 100 m LW10-11 – Finish time: 18,22 (→ 13. place )
  - Men's 500 m LW10-11 – Finish time: 1.21,26 (→ 13. place )
  - Men's 1000 m LW10-11 – Finish time: 3.06,93 (→ 11. place )
  - Men's 1500 m LW10-11 – (→ dnf, no ranking )
- Alja Kivi
  - Women's 100 m LW10-11 – Finish time: 21,69 (→ 4. place )
  - Women's 500 m LW10-11 – Finish time: 1.37,16 (→ 6. place )
  - Women's 700 m LW10-11 – (→ dqa, no ranking )
  - Women's 1000 m LW10-11 – Finish time: 3.07,12 (→ 5. place )

=== Ice sledge hockey ===
==== Preliminary round ====
- Preliminary Round 1: lost to Great Britain 0:2 ( 0:0, 0:1, 0:1 )
- Preliminary Round 2: lost to Canada 0:5 ( 0:4, 0:1, 0:0 )
- Preliminary Round 3: lost to Sweden 1:4 ( 0:1, 0:1, 1:2 )
- Preliminary Round 4: lost to Norway 1:6 ( 0:2, 0:3, 1:1 ) (→ did not to advance, 5. place )

== See also ==
- 1994 Winter Paralympics
- Estonia at the Paralympics
- Estonia at the 1994 Winter Olympics
