= Swimming at the 2004 Summer Paralympics – Men's 100 metre backstroke S10 =

Men's 100m Backstroke S10 at the XII Paralympic Games
- Paralympic Swimming
- Venue: Olympic Aquatic Centre
- Dates: 25 September 2004
- Competitors: 17 from 14 nations
- Winning time: 1:04.22

Medalists
| 1st place, gold medalist(s) | | Justin Zook | United States |
| 2nd place, silver medalist(s) | | Benoît Huot | Canada |
| 3rd place, bronze medalist(s) | | Rod Welsh | Australia |

The Men's 100 metre backstroke S10 swimming event at the 2004 Summer Paralympics was competed on 25 September. It was won by Justin Zook, representing United States.

== 1st round ==
| Qualified for next round |

Heat 1

25 Sept. 2004, morning session

| Rank | Athlete | Time | Notes |
|---|---|---|---|
| 1 | Justin Zook (USA) | 1:06.14 | |
| 2 | Priyadharshana Kalugala (SRI) | 1:06.55 | |
| 3 | Robert Welbourn (GBR) | 1:10.09 | |
| 4 | Luis Carlos Fernandez (CRC) | 1:10.89 | |
| 5 | Daniel Molina (ESP) | 1:12.10 | |

Heat 2

25 Sept. 2004, morning session

| Rank | Athlete | Time | Notes |
|---|---|---|---|
| 1 | Rod Welsh (AUS) | 1:06.59 | |
| 2 | Joost de Hoogh (NED) | 1:08.76 | |
| 3 | Rick Pendleton (AUS) | 1:11.67 | |
| 4 | Piotr Pijanowski (POL) | 1:12.42 | |
| 5 | Ismet Ayik (TUR) | 1:12.95 | |
| | Steven Sualang (INA) | DSQ | |

Heat 3

25 Sept. 2004, morning session

| Rank | Athlete | Time | Notes |
|---|---|---|---|
| 1 | Benoît Huot (CAN) | 1:07.70 | |
| 2 | Jody Cundy (GBR) | 1:08.12 | |
| 3 | Sven Decaesstecker (BEL) | 1:09.63 | |
| 4 | Kardo Ploomipuu (EST) | 1:09.80 | |
| 5 | Marc Woods (GBR) | 1:10.28 | |
| 6 | Filip Coufal (CZE) | 1:11.28 | |

== Final round ==
25 Sept. 2004, evening session

| Rank | Athlete | Time | Notes |
|---|---|---|---|
| 1st place, gold medalist(s) | Justin Zook (USA) | 1:04.22 | |
| 2nd place, silver medalist(s) | Benoît Huot (CAN) | 1:04.30 | |
| 3rd place, bronze medalist(s) | Rod Welsh (AUS) | 1:04.55 | |
| 4 | Priyadharshana Kalugala (SRI) | 1:06.31 | |
| 5 | Jody Cundy (GBR) | 1:07.61 | |
| 6 | Sven Decaesstecker (BEL) | 1:07.83 | |
| 7 | Joost de Hoogh (NED) | 1:08.41 | |
| 8 | Kardo Ploomipuu (EST) | 1:08.99 | |
