= Estonia at the 2020 Summer Paralympics =

- IPC code: EST
- NPC: Estonian Paralympic Committee
- Website: www.paralympic.ee

in Tokyo
- Competitors: 5 in 2 sports

Summer Paralympics appearances (overview)
- 1992; 1996; 2000; 2004; 2008; 2012; 2016; 2020; 2024

Other related appearances
- Soviet Union (1988)

Estonia competed at the 2020 Summer Paralympics in Tokyo, Japan, from 24 August to 5 September 2021.

== Athletics ==
Estonia have secured one quota in athletics.

Men's field

Athlete	Event	Final	
Athlete	Event	Results	Rank
Egert Jõesaar	Discus throw F64	44.07	5

== Swimming ==
Four Estonian swimmers has successfully earned Paralympic slots after breaking the Minimum Qualification Standard (MQS).

Men

Athlete	Event	Heats		Final	
Athlete	Event	Result	Rank	Result	Rank
Robin Liksor	100m breaststroke SB8	DNS			
Kardo Ploomipuu	100m backstroke S10	1:06.90	9	Did not advance	
Matz Topkin	50m freestyle S4	43.91	14	Did not advance	
Matz Topkin	50m backstroke S4	47.12	7 Q	45.42	6

Women

Athlete	Event	Heats		Final	
Athlete	Event	Result	Rank	Result	Rank
Susannah Kaul	50m freestyle S10	29.09	10	Did not advance	
Susannah Kaul	100m freestyle S10	1:05.10	13	Did not advance	

== See also ==
- Estonia at the 2020 Summer Olympics
- Estonia at the Paralympics
