= Estonia at the 2026 Winter Paralympics =

- Flag of Estonia
- IPC code: EST

in Milan & Cortina d'Ampezzo, Italy 6 March 2026 – 15 March 2026
- Medals: Gold 0 Silver 0 Bronze 0 Total 0

Winter Paralympics appearances (overview)
- 1992; 1994; 1998; 2002; 2006–2018; 2022; 2026

Other related appearances
- Soviet Union (1988)

Estonia was represented at the 2026 Winter Paralympics in Milan & Cortina d'Ampezzo, Italy, which took place between 6–15 March 2026.

== Competitors ==
The following is the list of number of competitors participating at the Games per sport/discipline.

The team includes Katlin Riidebach and Ain Villau.

Sport	Men	Women	Total
Wheelchair curling	1	1	2
Total	1	1	2

== Wheelchair curling ==
Summary

Team	Event	Group stage								Semifinal	Final / BM	
Team	Event	Opposition Score	Opposition Score	Opposition Score	Opposition Score	Opposition Score	Opposition Score	Opposition Score	Rank	Opposition Score	Opposition Score	Rank
Katlin Riidebach; Ain Villau	Mixed doubles	GBR; W 10–7	ITA; W 6–4	USA; L 4–8	LAT; L 6–9	CHN; L 2–12	JPN; L 3–8	KOR; L 0–10	7	Did not advance		

=== Mixed doubles ===
Final Round Robin Standings
Team	Athletes	Pld	W	L	W–L	PF	PA	EW	EL	BE	SE	S%	DSC	Qualification
China	Wang Meng / Yang Jinqiao	7	6	1	–	66	32	32	21	0	14	64.9%	106.033	Playoffs
United States	Laura Dwyer / Steve Emt	7	4	3	1–1	43	43	25	27	0	9	53.4%	89.717	Playoffs
South Korea	Baek Hye-jin / Lee Yong-suk	7	4	3	1–1	58	26	30	19	0	17	59.9%	142.058	Playoffs
Latvia	Poļina Rožkova / Agris Lasmans	7	4	3	1–1	46	45	28	25	0	12	48.5%	150.675	Playoffs
Great Britain	Jo Butterfield / Jason Kean	7	3	4	1–0	47	56	25	29	0	8	51.5%	95.075	
Japan	Aki Ogawa / Yoji Nakajima	7	3	4	0–1	30	53	19	30	0	8	49.0%	88.067	
Estonia	Katlin Riidebach / Ain Villau	7	2	5	1–0	31	58	22	28	0	9	47.6%	98.233	
Italy	Orietta Bertò / Paolo Ioriatti	7	2	5	0–1	43	51	28	30	0	11	55.6%	73.700	

Source: Official website

Round robin

Draw 1
Wednesday, March 4, 19:05

Sheet C	1	2	3	4	5	6	7	8	Final
Great Britain (Butterfield / Kean)	0	2	0	0	2	3	0	0	7
Estonia (Riidebach / Villau) 🔨	2	0	2	1	0	0	3	2	10

Draw 2
Thursday, March 5, 10:05

Sheet B	1	2	3	4	5	6	7	8	Final
Estonia (Riidebach / Villau) 🔨	1	0	1	1	1	1	1	0	6
Italy (Bertò / Ioriatti)	0	1	0	0	0	0	0	3	4

Draw 3
Thursday, March 5, 19:05

Sheet A	1	2	3	4	5	6	7	8	Final
United States (Dwyer / Emt)	0	3	2	2	0	1	0	X	8
Estonia (Riidebach / Villau) 🔨	2	0	0	0	1	0	1	X	4

Draw 4
Friday, March 6, 9:05

Sheet D	1	2	3	4	5	6	7	8	Final
Estonia (Riidebach / Villau) 🔨	0	0	2	0	3	1	0	X	6
Latvia (Rožkova / Lasmans)	1	1	0	3	0	0	4	X	9

Draw 5
Saturday, March 7, 14:35

Sheet B	1	2	3	4	5	6	7	8	Final
China (Wang / Yang) 🔨	2	0	1	3	3	0	3	X	12
Estonia (Riidebach / Villau)	0	1	0	0	0	1	0	X	2

Draw 6
Sunday, March 8, 14:35

Sheet C	1	2	3	4	5	6	7	8	Final
Estonia (Riidebach / Villau) 🔨	1	1	1	0	0	0	0	X	3
Japan (Ogawa / Nakajima)	0	0	0	3	1	1	3	X	8

Draw 7
Monday, March 9, 14:35

Sheet D	1	2	3	4	5	6	7	8	Final
South Korea (Baek / Lee) 🔨	3	1	1	1	3	1	X	X	10
Estonia (Riidebach / Villau)	0	0	0	0	0	0	X	X	0

== See also ==
- Estonia at the Paralympics
- Estonia at the 2026 Winter Olympics
