= Õnne =

Female given name

- Gender: Feminine
- Language: Estonian
- Name day: 29 August

Origin
- Languages: 1. Proto-Finnic; 2. Estonian
- Origin: 1. õnn 2. õnne
- Meaning: 1. Happiness; 2. Luck
- Region of origin: Estonian

Other names
- Related names: Õnnela, Õnneleid

Õnne is an Estonian language feminine given name, derived from õnne, the genitive singular / attributive form of õnn, meaning "(good) luck" and "happiness".

As of 1 January 2022, 366 women in Estonia bear the name Õnne, making it the 372nd most popular female name in the country. The name is most common in Hiiu County, where 8.37 per 10,000 inhabitants of the county bear the name.

Notable individuals named Õnne include:

- Õnne Kepp (born 1955), literary scholar
- Õnne Kurg (born 1973), cross-country skier
- Õnne Pärl (born 1965), journalist and photographer
- Õnne Pillak (born 1983), politician
- Õnne Pollisinski (born 1951), swimmer and swimming coach

== See also ==
- Õnne 13
