= Swimming at the 2008 Summer Paralympics – Men's 100 metre backstroke S10 =

Men's 100m Backstroke S10 at the XIII Paralympic Games
- Venue: Beijing National Aquatics Center
- Dates: 13 September, 17 July, 31 January
- Competitors: 13 from 9 nations
- Winning time: 1:01.29

Medalists
1st place, gold medalist(s)		Justin Zook	United States
2nd place, silver medalist(s)		Michael Anderson	Australia
3rd place, bronze medalist(s)		Kardo Ploomipuu	Estonia

The men's 100m backstroke S10 event at the 2008 Summer Paralympics took place at the Beijing National Aquatics Center on 13 September. There were two heats; the swimmers with the eight fastest times advanced to the final.

== Results ==
=== Heats ===
Competed from 09:52.

==== Heat 1 ====
Rank	Name	Nationality	Time	Notes
1	Michael Anderson	Australia	1:01.70	Q, PR
2	Kardo Ploomipuu	Estonia	1:04.52	Q
3	Roy Tobis	Germany	1:04.63	Q
4	Jeremy Tidy	Australia	1:05.37	Q
5	Lucas Ludwig	Germany	1:05.61	
6	Denys Graniuk	Ukraine	1:06.02	

==== Heat 2 ====
Rank	Name	Nationality	Time	Notes
1	Justin Zook	United States	1:01.15	Q, WR
2	Benoît Huot	Canada	1:03.85	Q
3	Andrew Pasterfield	Australia	1:04.26	Q
4	André Brasil	Brazil	1:04.44	Q
5	Sven Decaesstecker	Belgium	1:05.44	
6	Maksym Isayev	Ukraine	1:05.82	
7	Filip Coufal	Czech Republic	1:06.84	

=== Final ===
Competed at 18:29.

Rank	Name	Nationality	Time	Notes
1st place, gold medalist(s)	Justin Zook	United States	1:01.29	PR
2nd place, silver medalist(s)	Michael Anderson	Australia	1:01.47	
3rd place, bronze medalist(s)	Kardo Ploomipuu	Estonia	1:03.37	
4	André Brasil	Brazil	1:03.63	
5	Benoît Huot	Canada	1:03.81	
6	Roy Tobis	Germany	1:03.88	
7	Andrew Pasterfield	Australia	1:04.24	
8	Jeremy Tidy	Australia	1:05.26	

Q = qualified for final. WR = World Record. PR = Paralympic Record.
