= Hallik =

Hallik is an Estonian surname. Notable people with the surname include:

- Helger Hallik (born 1972), Estonian wrestler
- Klara Hallik (1933–2025), Estonian politician and political scientist
- Külli Hallik (born 1954), Estonian skier and coach
- Reinar Hallik (born 1984), Estonian basketball player

== See also ==
- Arvo Hallik, husband of Kaja Kallas, Estonian politician and diplomat
- Halligen (singular Hallig), small islands in the North Sea
