= Loretta Claiborne =

American speaker and athlete

Personal information
- Born: August 14, 1953 (age 73) York, Pennsylvania, U.S.
- Home town: York, Pennsylvania, U.S.
- Occupation: Athlete

Sport
- Country: USA
- Sport: Mile run, Bowling, Figure Skating
Medal record
Special Olympic Games
Mile Run
Representing United States
Gold medal – first place	1983 Baton Rouge	Mile run
Bronze medal – third place	2003 Dublin	Mile run
Bowling
Gold medal – first place	1995 Connecticut	Singles Bowling
Gold medal – first place	1995 Connecticut	Mixed Double Bowling
13k run
Gold medal – first place	1991 Minneapolis	13k run
Gold medal – first place	1999 Raleigh	13k run
5k run
Silver medal – second place	1991 Minneapolis	5k run
3k run
Silver medal – second place	1999 Raleigh	3k run
Gold medal – first place	2003 Dublin	3k run
Figure Skating
Silver medal – second place	2005 Nagano	Figure Skating
Tennis
Gold medal – first place	2023 Berlin	Tennis Women's Singles
Bronze medal – third place	2023 Berlin	Tennis Women's Doubles

Loretta Claiborne is an American global speaker and multi-sport athlete who competes in the Special Olympics. She has been honored with the 1996 Arthur Ashe ESPY Courage Award presented to her by Denzel Washington. Claiborne was the first Special Olympics athlete elected to the Special Olympics International Board of Directors.

== Biography ==
Loretta Claiborne was born on August 14, 1953, in York, Pennsylvania. She was the fourth of seven children, and she and her siblings were raised by their single mother, Rita Claiborne. Loretta Claiborne was born partially blind, with an intellectual disability and clubbed feet; she underwent surgeries to correct her feet and visual impairment when she was young, and was unable to walk until she was four years old. She learned to talk when she was seven. Although doctors advised Claiborne's mother to institutionalize the girl, Rita steadfastly refused, choosing to raise Claiborne at home with her other children.

When Claiborne was 17, a school counselor suggested she participate in the newly formed Special Olympics. Claiborne subsequently competed as a runner at the Special Olympics of 1970, where she received her first medal as an athlete.

She has completed over 25 marathons and has placed in the top 100 women finishers of the Boston Marathon twice. In 2000, Claiborne's life was the subject of "The Loretta Claiborne Story", a television film.

=== Special Olympic world games ===
She is also a karate black belt, has been competing in the Special Olympics since 1970, and continues to train in running, figure skating, soccer, skiing, golf, basketball, softball, swimming, tennis, and bowling. Loretta was the 1981 Spirit of Special Olympics award recipient, and the 1988 state athlete of the year. She is on the Special Olympics Pennsylvania Board of Directors, and in 2007 returned to the Special Olympics International Board of Directors.

In May 2009, the Smithsonian's National Portrait Gallery in Washington, D.C., unveiled a historic portrait of Special Olympics founder Eunice Kennedy Shriver, the first portrait the Gallery has ever commissioned of an individual who had not served as a U.S. president or First Lady. The portrait of Mrs. Shriver depicts her with four Special Olympics athletes, including Loretta Claiborne, and one Best Buddies participant and was painted by David Lenz, the winner of the Outwin Boochever Portrait Competition in 2006.

At age 60 in 2013, Claiborne remained physically active but was beginning to focus more on connecting with and inspiring others.

As of 2019, at the age of 65, Claiborne was continuing to compete in ten sports each year at the Special Olympics.

== Honors ==
Claiborne has received three honorary doctorate degrees, one from Quinnipiac University one from Villanova University, and one from York College of Pennsylvania. In 1996, Claiborne was awarded the Arthur Ashe Courage Award from ESPN, and in 2000 she became the subject of a made-for-TV Disney film titled The Loretta Claiborne Story. In 2001, a medical and educational facility in her home community of York, Pennsylvania was named the Loretta Claiborne Building in her honor.
