= Estonia at the 2024 Summer Paralympics =

- IPC code: EST
- NPC: Estonian Paralympic Committee
- Website: www.paralympic.ee

in Paris, France August 28, 2024 – September 8, 2024
- Competitors: 5 in 3 sports
- Flag bearers: Laura-Liis Juursalu; Robin Liksor
- Medals: Gold 0 Silver 0 Bronze 0 Total 0

Summer Paralympics appearances (overview)
- 1992; 1996; 2000; 2004; 2008; 2012; 2016; 2020; 2024

Other related appearances
- Soviet Union (1988)

Estonia competed at the 2024 Summer Paralympics in Paris, France, from 28 August to 8 September.

== Competitors ==
The following is the list of number of competitors in the Games.

Sport	Men	Women	Total
Athletics	1	0	1
Swimming	2	1	3
Paratriathalon	0	1	1
Total	3	2	5

== Athletics ==
Field events

Athlete	Event	Final	
Athlete	Event	Results	Rank
Egert Jõesaar	Men's discus throw F64	50.09	8

== Swimming ==
Athlete	Event	Heats		Final	
Athlete	Event	Result	Rank	Result	Rank
Susannah Kaul	Women's 50 m freestyle S10	29.76	15	Did not advance	
Susannah Kaul	Women's 100 m backstroke S10				
Robin Liksor	Men's 100 m breaststroke SB8	1:13.65	11	Did not advance	
Matz Topkin	Men's 50 m backstroke S4	46.24	6 Q	47.03	7

== Paratriathlon ==
Athlete	Event	Swim	Trans 1	Bike	Trans 2	Run	Total time	Rank
Laura-Liis Juursalu	Women's PTS5	22:42	1:07	38:38	0:39	24:06	1:27:12	10

== See also ==
- Estonia at the 2024 Summer Olympics
- Estonia at the Paralympics
