= Nugis =

Nugis is a surname. Notable people with the surname include:

- Ülo Nugis (1944–2011), Estonian politician and economist
- Vilma Nugis (1958–2024), Estonian para skier
