= Estonia at the 2022 Winter Paralympics =

- Flag of Estonia
- IPC code: EST
- NPC: Estonian Paralympic Committee
- Website: www.paralympic.ee (in Estonian)

in Beijing, China 4 March 2022 – 13 March 2022
- Competitors: 5 (3 men and 2 women)
- Flag bearers: Signe Falkenberg; Mait Mätas
- Medals: Gold 0 Silver 0 Bronze 0 Total 0

Winter Paralympics appearances (overview)
- 1992; 1994; 1998; 2002; 2006–2018; 2022; 2026

Other related appearances
- Soviet Union (1988)

Estonia was represented at the 2022 Winter Paralympics in Beijing, China by the Estonian Paralympic Committee.

In total, five athletes represented Estonia, all in the wheelchair curling.

== Competitors ==
In total, five athletes represented Estonia at the 2022 Winter Paralympics in Beijing, China in one sport.

Sport	Men	Women	Total
Wheelchair curling	3	2	5
Total	3	2	5

== Wheelchair curling ==
Five Estonian athletes participated in the wheelchair curling – skip Andrei Koitmäe, third Lauri Murasov, second Mait Mätas, lead Katlin Riidebach and alternate Signe Falkenberg.

The wheelchair curling took place at the Beijing National Aquatics Centre in the Chaoyang District of Beijing from 5–12 March 2022. Estonia played their first round-robin matches on 6 March 2022. They lost their first match 9–6 against the USA and, later on the same day, they lost 9–3 to hosts China. On 7 March 2022, Estonia won their first match of the competition by defeating Latvia 6–5 before they defeated Norway 8–3 to hold a record of two wins and two losses after three days of competition.

The following day, 8 March 2022, Estonia's winning streak ended as they lost 10–5 to Great Britain before losing 6–4 against Sweden. On 9 March 2022, Estonia lost 5–2 to South Korea before subsequently extending their losing streak to four matches following a 9–3 defeat against Canada.

Estonia played their final round-robin matches on 10 March 2022. After defeating Switzerland 8–6, they lost their final round-robin match against Slovakia 7–6. As a result, Estonia ended the competition with a record of three wins and seven losses as they finished in 10th position overall. They did not compete in the pay-offs.

Summary

Team	Event	Group stage											Semifinal	Final / BM	
Team	Event	Opposition Score	Opposition Score	Opposition Score	Opposition Score	Opposition Score	Opposition Score	Opposition Score	Opposition Score	Opposition Score	Opposition Score	Rank	Opposition Score	Opposition Score	Rank
Andrei Koitmäe; Lauri Murasov; Mait Mätas; Katlin Riidebach; Signe Falkenberg	Mixed	USA; L 6–9	CHN; L 3–9	LAT; W 6–5	NOR; W 8–3	GBR; L 5–10	SWE; L 4–6	KOR; L 2–5	CAN; L 3–9	SUI; W 8–6	SVK; L 6–7	10	did not advance		

Round robin Final round-robin standings

Key
Teams to Playoffs

Country	Skip	W	L	W–L	PF	PA	EW	EL	BE	SE	S%	DSC
China	Wang Haitao	8	2	–	68	39	36	28	2	13	71%	122.32
Slovakia	Radoslav Ďuriš	7	3	2–0	65	57	40	33	1	16	65%	95.19
Sweden	Viljo Petersson-Dahl	7	3	1–1	66	52	37	35	3	18	68%	91.08
Canada	Mark Ideson	7	3	0–2	69	50	36	33	2	11	71%	95.29
United States	Matthew Thums	5	5	1–0	60	75	32	39	2	6	60%	70.98
South Korea	Go Seung-nam	5	5	0–1	64	59	35	37	0	11	64%	103.20
Norway	Jostein Stordahl	4	6	2–0	60	64	37	38	2	13	64%	107.82
Great Britain	Hugh Nibloe	4	6	1–1	67	56	37	36	0	16	62%	134.75
Latvia	Poļina Rožkova	4	6	0–2	61	71	40	32	0	18	63%	100.43
Estonia	Andrei Koitmäe	3	7	–	51	69	32	41	2	13	61%	106.21
Switzerland	Laurent Kneubühl	1	9	–	48	87	32	42	0	8	56%	109.27

Wheelchair curling round robin summary table
Pos.	Country	Canada	China	Estonia	Great Britain	Japan	Norway	Slovakia	South Korea	Sweden	Switzerland	United States	Record
4	Canada	—N/a	7–3	9–3	6–3	10–3	7–6	8–9	4–9	3–6	8–4	7–4	7–3
1	China	3–7	—	9–3	6–3	9–2	7–4	7–5	9–4	1–5	7–4	10–2	8–2
10	Estonia	3–9	3–9	—	5–10	6–5	8–3	6–7	2–5	4–6	8–6	6–9	3–7
8	Great Britain	3–6	3–6	10–5	—	8–4	5–7	3–7	6–8	4–6	15–1	10–6	4–6
9	Latvia	3–10	2–9	5–6	4–8	—	6–8	8–4	8–4	9–7	9–7	7–8	4–6
7	Norway	6–7	4–7	3–8	7–5	8–6	—	9–3	4–9	6–8	8–5	5–6	4–6
2	Slovakia	9–8	5–7	7–6	7–3	4–8	3–9	—	7–2	6–5	8–6	9–3	7–3
6	South Korea	9–4	4–9	5–2	8–6	4–8	9–4	2–7	—	10–4	7–8	6–7	5–5
3	Sweden	6–3	5–1	6–4	6–4	7–9	8–6	5–6	4–10	—	9–2	10–7	7–3
11	Switzerland	4–8	4–7	6–8	1–15	7–9	5–8	6–8	8–7	2–9	—	5–8	1–9
5	United States	4–7	2–10	9–6	6–10	8–7	6–5	3–9	7–6	7–10	8–5	—	5–5

Draw 4
Sunday, March 6, 14:35

Sheet D	1	2	3	4	5	6	7	8	Final
Estonia (Koitmäe)	1	0	0	2	0	1	2	0	6
United States (Thums) 🔨	0	3	0	0	4	0	0	2	9

Draw 5
Sunday, March 6, 19:35

Sheet A	1	2	3	4	5	6	7	8	Final
Estonia (Koitmäe)	0	0	1	0	0	2	0	X	3
China (Wang) 🔨	3	1	0	2	1	0	2	X	9

Draw 6
Monday, March 7, 9:35

Sheet B	1	2	3	4	5	6	7	8	Final
Latvia (Rožkova) 🔨	0	0	1	1	1	2	0	0	5
Estonia (Koitmäe)	2	2	0	0	0	0	1	1	6

Draw 7
Monday, March 7, 14:35

Sheet A	1	2	3	4	5	6	7	8	Final
Norway (Stordahl) 🔨	2	0	0	0	0	0	1	X	3
Estonia (Koitmäe)	0	1	2	1	1	3	0	X	8

Draw 9
Tuesday, March 8, 9:35

Sheet C	1	2	3	4	5	6	7	8	Final
Great Britain (Nibloe)	0	3	2	0	4	1	0	X	10
Estonia (Koitmäe) 🔨	1	0	0	3	0	0	1	X	5

Draw 10
Tuesday, March 8, 14:35

Sheet B	1	2	3	4	5	6	7	8	Final
Sweden (Petersson-Dahl)	1	0	0	2	1	0	1	1	6
Estonia (Koitmäe) 🔨	0	1	1	0	0	2	0	0	4

Draw 12
Wednesday, March 9, 9:35

Sheet C	1	2	3	4	5	6	7	8	Final
Estonia (Koitmäe)	0	0	0	1	0	0	1	X	2
South Korea (Jang) 🔨	1	0	2	0	1	1	0	X	5

Draw 14
Wednesday, March 9, 19:35

Sheet B	1	2	3	4	5	6	7	8	Final
Estonia (Koitmäe) 🔨	0	2	0	1	0	0	0	X	3
Canada (Ideson)	1	0	3	0	1	2	2	X	9

Draw 16
Thursday, March 10, 14:35

Sheet A	1	2	3	4	5	6	7	8	Final
Switzerland (Kneubühl)	1	0	2	0	0	0	2	1	6
Estonia (Koitmäe) 🔨	0	1	0	2	2	3	0	0	8

Draw 17
Thursday, March 10, 19:35

Sheet D	1	2	3	4	5	6	7	8	Final
Slovakia (Ďuriš) 🔨	1	0	0	1	0	2	1	2	7
Estonia (Koitmäe)	0	1	3	0	2	0	0	0	6

== See also ==
- Estonia at the Paralympics
- Estonia at the 2022 Winter Olympics
