= Tiiu Aro =

Estonian physician and politician

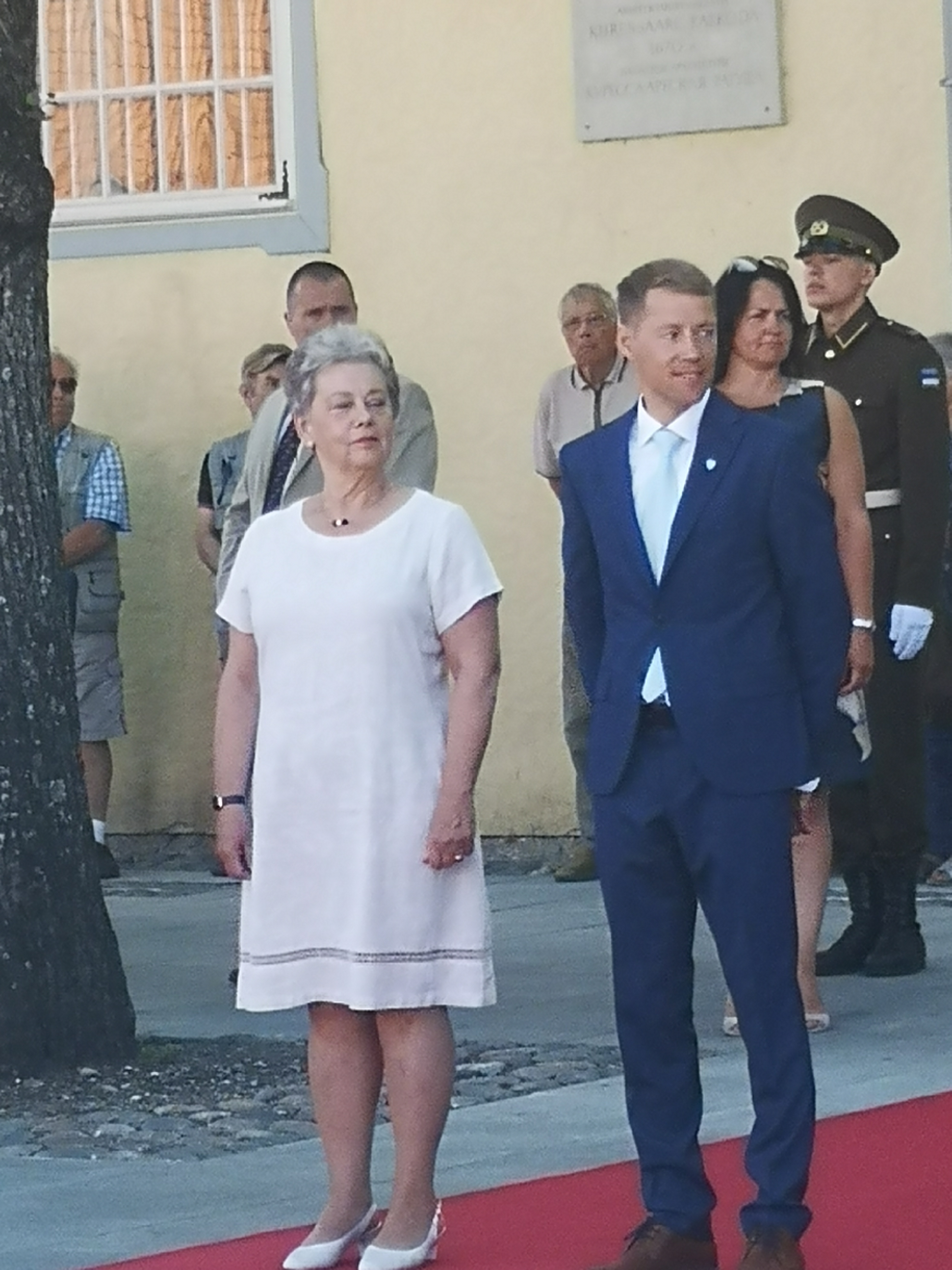
- Tiiu Aro and Mikk Tuisk waiting for Estonian and Latvian president Foto: Ave Maria Mõistlik, 25. June 2020

Minister of Social Affairs
- In office 2 December 1996 – 25 March 1999
- Prime Minister: Tiit Vähi; Mart Siimann
- Preceded by: Toomas Vilosius
- Succeeded by: Eiki Nestor

Personal details
- Born: 18 June 1952 (age 73) Kuressaare, then part of Estonian SSR, Soviet Union

Tiiu Aro (born June 18, 1952, in Kuressaare) is an Estonian physician and politician.

She is a former Minister of Social Affairs of Estonia, having served in that position from 1996 to 1999. Her aunt, Marta Kivi (born 6 February 1912) is the oldest known living person in Estonia.

From 1999 to 2009 she worked as Director General of the Estonian Health Inspection and on 1 January 2010 she became Director General of the Health Board.

Preceded by Toomas Vilosius	Minister of Social Affairs of Estonia; 2 December 1996 – 25 March 1999	Succeeded by Eiki Nestor
