= Siiri Oviir =

Estonian politician (born 1947)

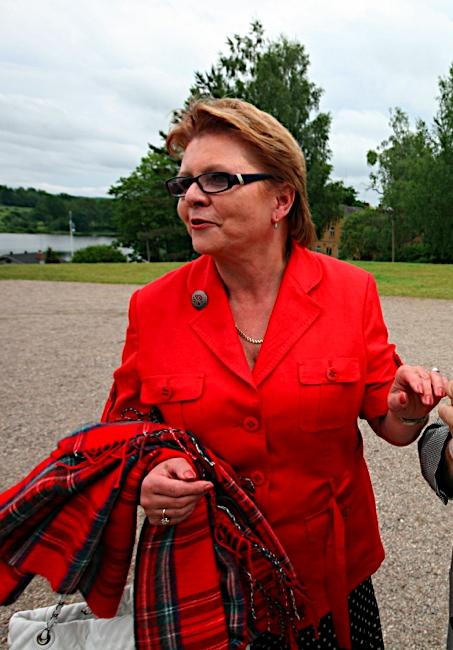
- Siiri Oviir in 2010.

Minister of Social Affairs
- In office 17 April 1995 – 20 November 1995
- Prime Minister: Tiit Vähi
- Preceded by: Toomas Vilosius
- Succeeded by: Toomas Vilosius
- In office 28 January 2002 – 9 April 2003
- Prime Minister: Siim Kallas
- Preceded by: Eiki Nestor
- Succeeded by: Marko Pomerants

Minister of Social Care
- In office 1990–1992
- Prime Minister: Edgar Savisaar
- Succeeded by: Arvo Kuddo

Personal details
- Born: 3 November 1947 (age 78) Tallinn, then part of Estonian SSR, Soviet Union
- Party: Estonian Centre Party

Siiri Oviir (born 3 November 1947) is an Estonian politician and Member of the European Parliament.

Oviir was born in Tallinn. As an MEP, she belonged to the Estonian Centre Party until she decided to leave on 9 April 2012.

Oviir is married to civil servant Mihkel Oviir. Her daughter is politician Liisa Oviir.

Preceded by none	Minister of Social Care of Estonia; 1990–1992	Succeeded by Arvo Kuddo
Preceded by Toomas Vilosius	Minister of Social Affairs of Estonia; 17 April 1995 – 20 November 1995	Succeeded by Toomas Vilosius
Preceded by Eiki Nestor	Minister of Social Affairs of Estonia; 28 January 2002 – 9 April 2003	Succeeded by Marko Pomerants
