= 2009 Special Olympics World Winter Games =

Multi-sport event in Boise, Idaho, US

10th Special Olympics World Winter Games
- Host city: Boise, Idaho, United States
- Nations: 100
- Athletes: 2,500
- Events: Alpine skiing, cross country skiing, snowboarding, snowshoeing, figure skating, short track speed skating, floor hockey
- Opening: February 7
- Closing: February 13
- Opened by: Butch Otter and Lori Otter
- Torch lighter: –
- Main venue: Idaho Center

Summer

Winter

Butch Otter and Lori Otter, Governor and First Lady of Idaho, open the games

The 2009 Special Olympics World Winter Games was an international, multi-sport event for persons with intellectual disabilities held in the state of Idaho, USA from February 7 through February 13, 2009.

Nearly 2,500 athletes from over 100 countries participated in the games. Dignitaries included actors, musicians, athletes and politicians from around the United States and the world. Seven sports were played: alpine skiing, cross country skiing, snowboarding, snowshoeing, figure skating, short track speed skating, and floor hockey. Vice President Joe Biden presented awards to athletes, and met athletes and their families at other events on Thursday, February 12. He further announced the appointment of Kareem Dale as special assistant to the president for disability policy. The economic downturn led to lower donation projections and budget cuts for production and entertainment for the opening and closing ceremonies.

The following cities in Idaho hosted the games:

- Boise
- McCall
- Sun Valley

== Venues ==
- Snowshoeing – McCall (Ponderosa State Park)
- Floor Hockey – Boise (Expo Idaho)
- Alpine Skiing – Boise (Bogus Basin Ski Resort)
- Figure Skating – Boise (Qwest Arena)
- Short track – Boise (Idaho Ice World)
- Cross-country Skiing – Sun Valley (Sun Valley Nordic Center)
- Snowboarding – Sun Valley (Dollar Mountain)

Preceded by Nagano, Japan	Special Olympics World Winter Games	Succeeded by PyeongChang, South Korea
