= Õnne Pollisinski =

Estonian underwater sportwoman, swimming coach, and sport personnel

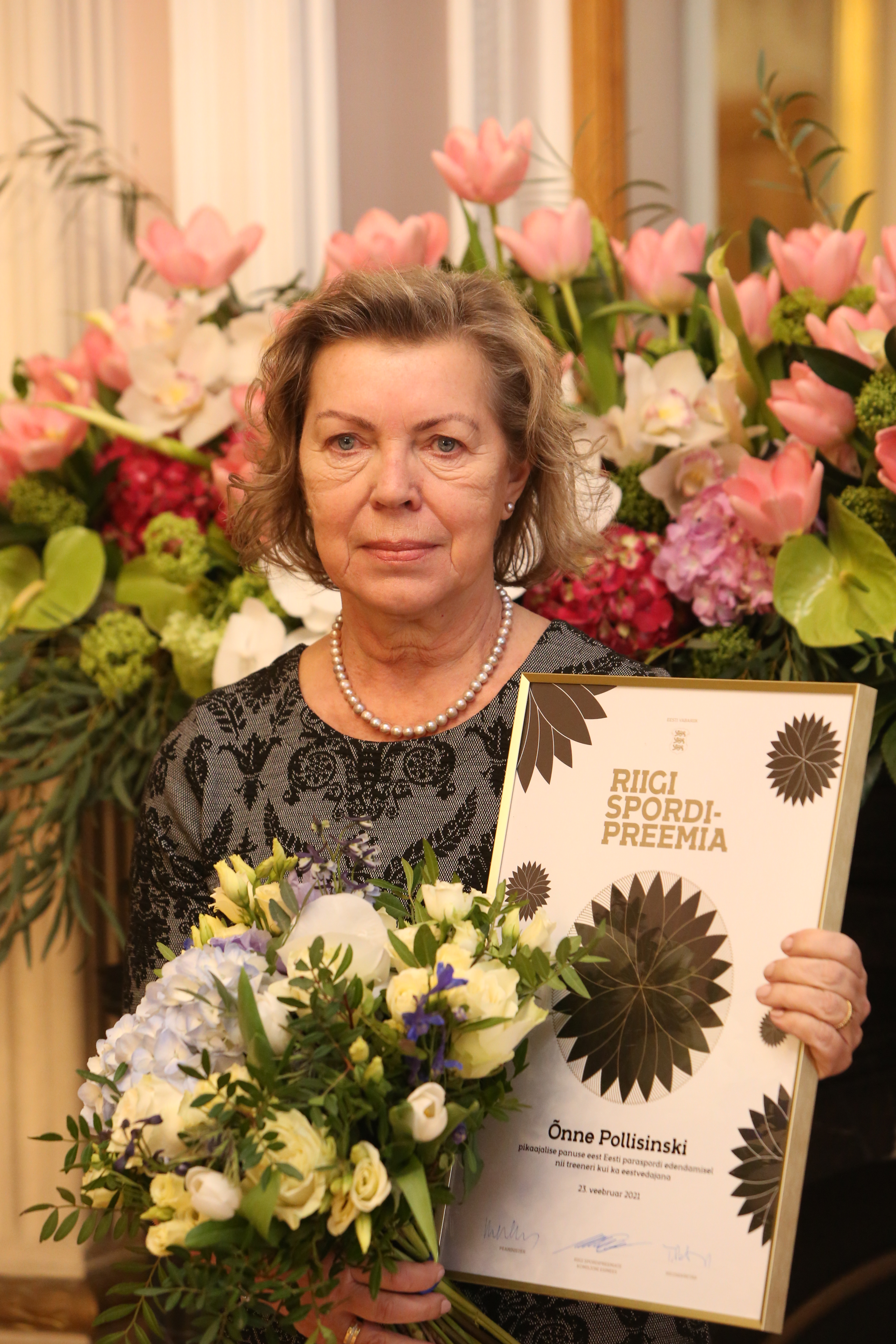

Personal information
- Born: March 5, 1951 (age 75) Tallinn, then part of Estonian SSR, Soviet Union

Sport
- Sport: Swimming

Õnne Pollisinski (before 1971 Õnne Simson; born 5 March 1951) is an Estonian underwater sportswoman, swimming coach and sport personnel.

From 1967 to 1971, she won several medals at Estonian championships.

From 1973 to 2006, she worked as a coach at sport club Kalev. Since 1991, she is working at sport club Meduus, coaching the disabled swimming sportpersons.

From 2012 to 2015, she was the president of Estonian Underwater Federation.

Students: Kardo Ploomipuu, Tiina Krutob, Aini Leik.

Awards:

- 1985: Merited Coach of Estonian SSR
- 2012: Order of the White Star, V class.
