= 2001 Special Olympics World Winter Games =

Multi-sport event in Anchorage, Alaska, US

7th Special Olympics World Winter Games
- Host city: Anchorage, Alaska, United States
- Nations: >80
- Athletes: ~2750
- Events: –7 sports
- Opening: March 4
- Closing: March 11
- Torch lighter: –

Summer

Winter

The 2001 Special Olympics World Winter Games was held of the Winter Special Olympics World Games. It is a multi-sporting event that was held from March 4 through March 11, 2001. It was hosted in the United States by Anchorage, Alaska.

Cross-country skiing, alpine skiing, speed skating, floor hockey, snowshoeing and snowboarding events took place at the Winter Special Olympics. More than 2750 athletes and coaches from 80 countries participated at the Games.

The local organizing committee raised about $17 million for the Games, while more than 6000 people worked as volunteers.

This event is the largest sporting event held in Alaskan history.

| Special Olympics World Winter Games | Succeeded by Nagano, Japan |
