= 1999 Special Olympics World Summer Games =

Multi-sport event in North Carolina, US

- Host city: Raleigh, North Carolina
- Nations: 150
- Athletes: 7,000+
- Events: 19 sports
- Opening: June 26, 1999
- Closing: July 4, 1999
- Opened by: Billy Crystal and Stevie Wonder
- Main venue: Carter–Finley Stadium (opening ceremony)

Summer

Winter

The 1999 Special Olympics World Summer Games were held in Raleigh, Durham, and Chapel Hill in North Carolina, United States between June 26 and July 4, 1999. The events in 19 sports were predominantly held on the campuses of North Carolina State University, the University of North Carolina at Chapel Hill, and North Carolina Central University.

The gymnastics venue opening ceremonies was held in the Raleigh Convention Center.

The 1999 Special Olympics World Summer Games received more than half of its funding from private corporations. Olympic historian Bob Barney stated "companies that donate millions might want say in how an event is run", but also felt it positive since "it brings the games to a much larger viewing audience".

== Events ==
- Aquatics (Chapel Hill)
- Athletics (Raleigh)
- Badminton (Durham)
- Basketball (Chapel Hill and Durham)
- Bocce (Pittsboro)
- Bowling (Raleigh)
- Cycling (Garner)
- Equestrian (Raleigh)
- Football / soccer (Raleigh)
- Golf (Durham and Cary)
- Gymnastics (Raleigh)
- Handball (Raleigh)
- Powerlifting (Raleigh)
- Roller skating (Raleigh)
- Sailing (Maryland coast)
- Softball (Raleigh)
- Table tennis (Chapel Hill)
- Tennis (Chapel Hill)
- Volleyball (Chapel Hill)

Preceded by Connecticut, United States	Special Olympics World Summer Games	Succeeded by Ireland
