= Arvo Kuddo =

Estonian economist and politician

Arvo Kuddo (born 20 November 1954 in Tartu) is an Estonian economist and politician.

== Political career ==
1990–1991, he was Minister of Social Care, and 1991–1992 he was Minister of Labor.
