= Rein Põldme =

Estonian rower

Rein Põldme (born 12 January 1937) is an Estonian rower, swimming coach and sport pedagogue.

He was born in Rakvere and graduated from Tartu University's Institute of Physical Education in 1958.

He started his swimming training in 1951 and took up rowing in 1954, under the guidance of Ülo Tölp. Between 1956 and 1957, he became 2-times Estonian champion in rowing.

From 1958 to 1964, he worked in Tartu as a sport theoretician. He later served as a physical education pedagogue in several schools in Tartu, including in disability schools.

Since 1965, he has been coaching para swimmers. His notable students include: Nadežda Maksimova, Tiiu Mallene-Sarv, Vilma Nugis, Marge Kõrkjas, Annika Raide, Paul Sepping, Ado Arukask, Mart Soomre, Virgo Kais.

Awards:

- 1988: Merited Coach of Estonian SSR
- 2014: Order of the White Star, V class
- 2020: (Estonian: Eesti Kultuurkapitali kehakultuuri ja spordi sihtkapitali aastapreemia)
