= Eiki Nestor =

Estonian politician (born 1953)

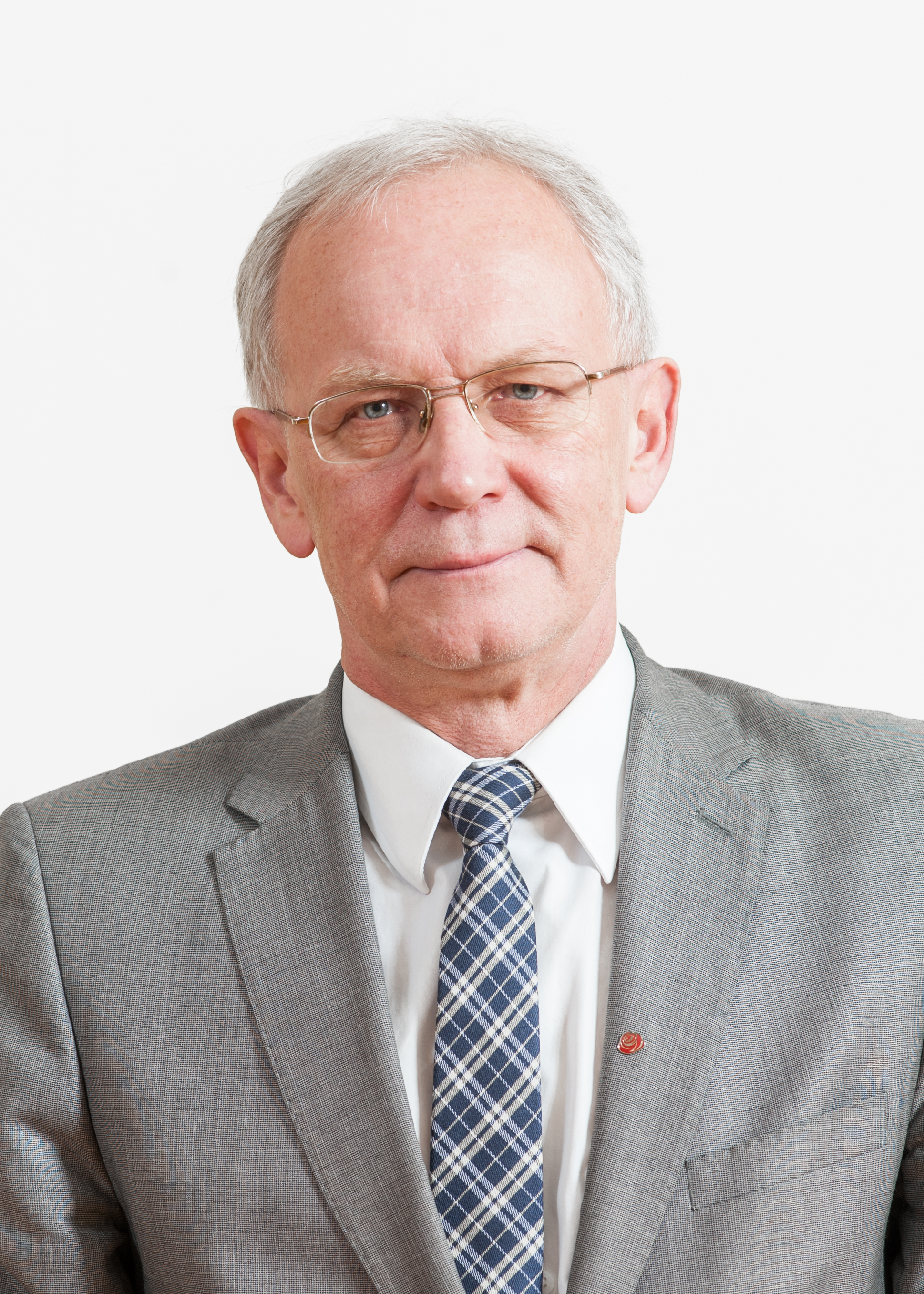
Eiki Nestor, 2015

Eiki Nestor (born 5 September 1953 in Tallinn) is an Estonian politician, member of the Social Democratic Party. He was the leader of the party from 1994 to 1996. Nestor has been a member of the 7th, 8th, 9th, 10th, 11th and 12th Parliament of Estonia, being a Minister without Portfolio in charge of regional affairs from 1994 to 1995 and a Minister of Social Affairs from 1999 to 2002. He was elected Speaker of the Riigikogu in March 2014 and served until April 2019.

Nestor graduated from the Tallinn University of Technology in 1976 as a mechanical engineer specializing in motor transport. He is married and has two sons, Siim Nestor and Madis Nestor.

Political offices
Preceded by Tiiu Aro	Minister of Social Affairs; 1999–2002	Succeeded by Siiri Oviir
Preceded by Ene Ergma	Speaker of the Riigikogu; 2014–2019	Succeeded by Henn Põlluaas
