= Michael Anderson (swimmer) =

Australian Paralympic swimmer

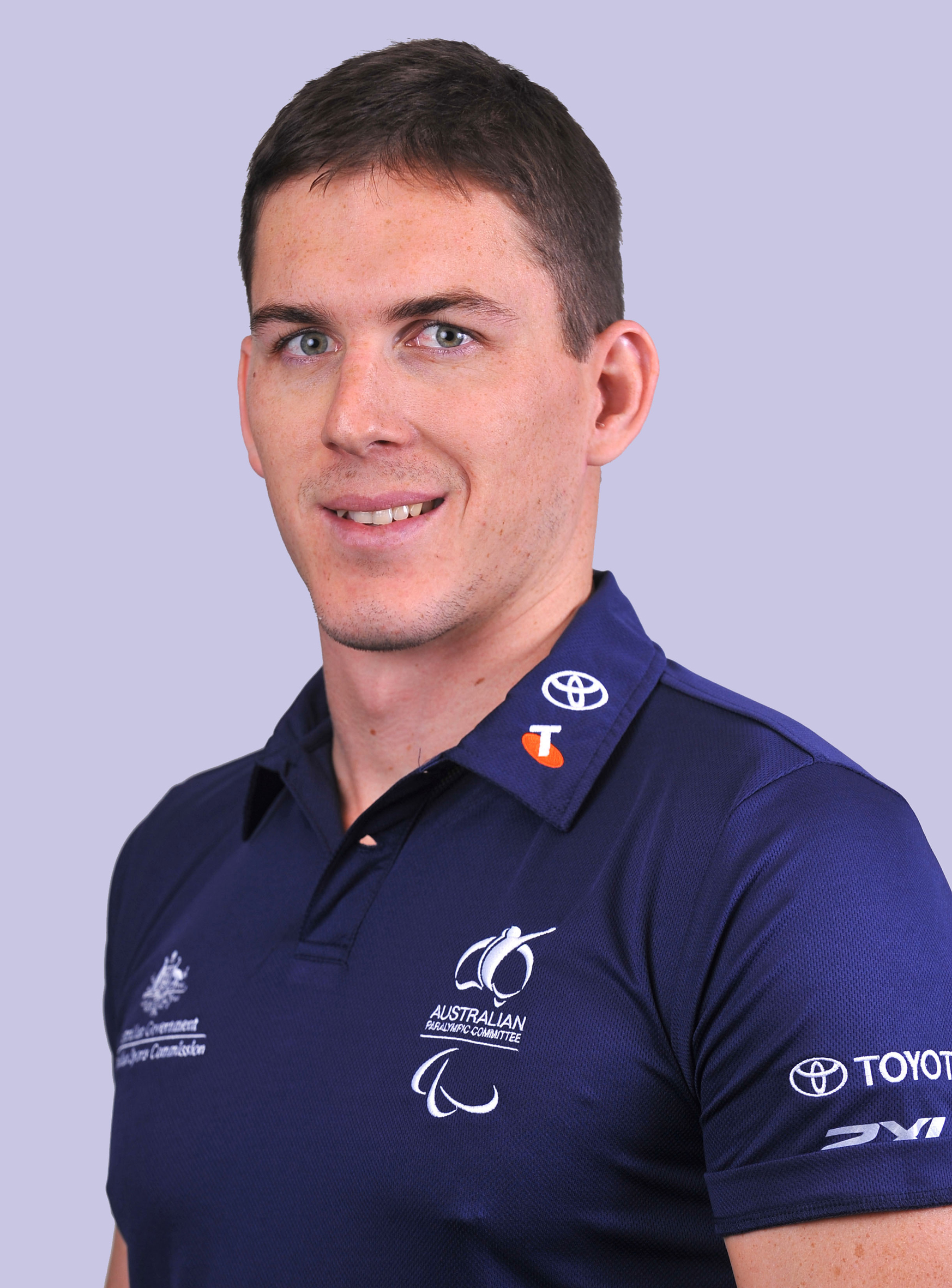
- 2012 Australian Paralympic team portrait of Anderson

Personal information
- Full name: Michael James Anderson
- Nationality: Australia
- Born: 12 July 1987 (age 39) Bellingen, New South Wales

Sport
- Sport: Swimming
- Strokes: Backstroke, Freestyle
- Classifications: S10, SB9, SM10
- Club: Somerset
Medal record
Men's paralympic swimming
Representing Australia
Paralympic Games
Gold medal – first place	2012 London	4×100 m freestyle 34 points
Silver medal – second place	2008 Beijing	100 m backstroke S10
Bronze medal – third place	2012 London	4 × 100 m medley 34 points
World Championships (LC)
Silver medal – second place	2006 Durban	100 m backstroke S10
Bronze medal – third place	2015 Glasgow	4 × 100 m freestyle 34 points (heats)

Michael Anderson, OAM (born 12 July 1987) is an Australian Paralympic swimmer who has won gold, silver and bronze medals at the three Paralympics from 2008 to 2016.

== Personal ==
Anderson has nerve damage to his leg caused by meningitis and a hearing impairment. He was born and grew up in Bellingen in the Northern Rivers. He moved to the Gold Coast to study for a Bachelor of Sport Management degree at Griffith University.

== Career ==
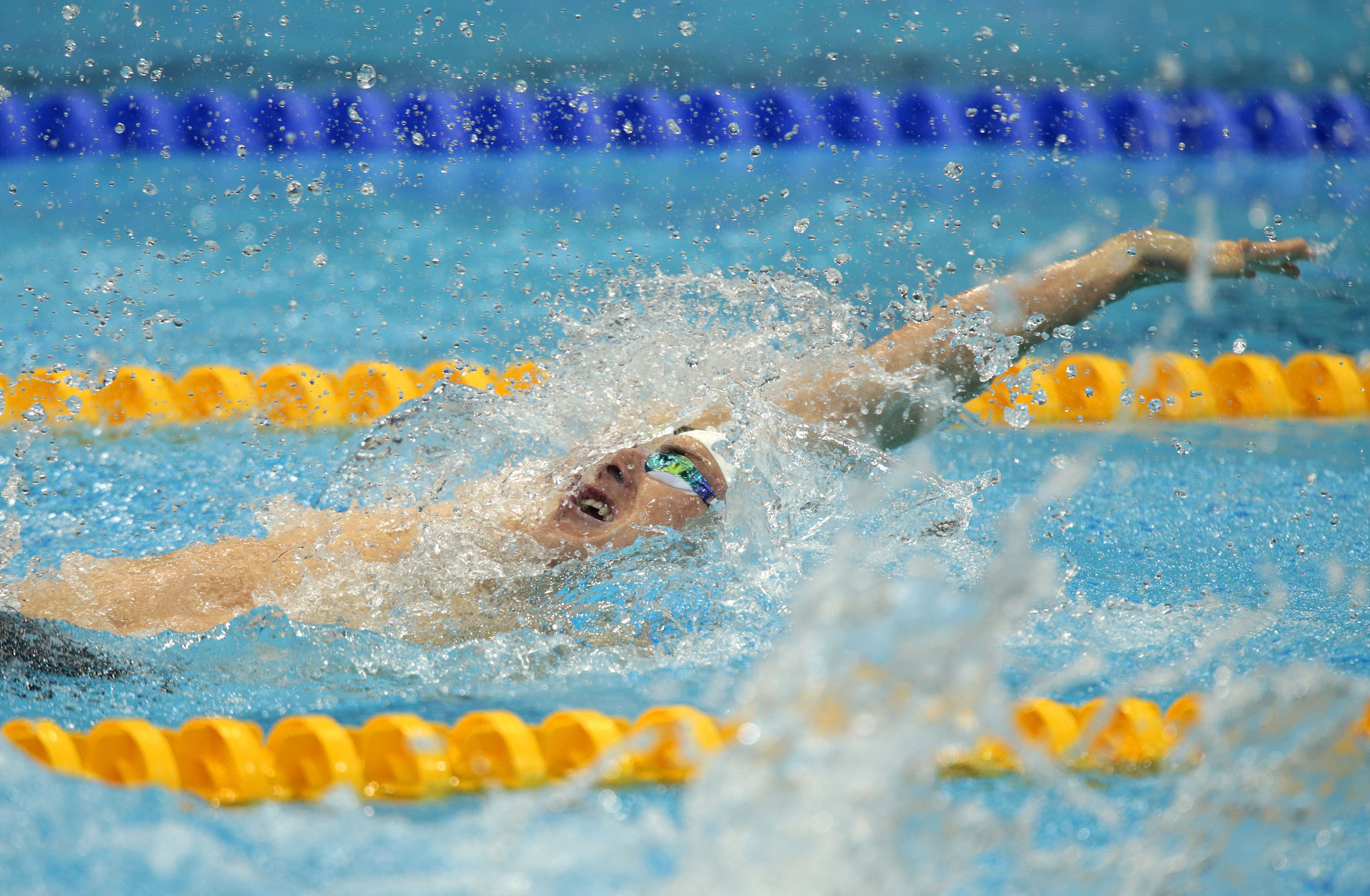
Anderson at the 2012 London Paralympics

Anderson made his international debut at the 2005 Deaflympics in Melbourne where he finished sixth in the 50m backstroke.

At the 2006 IPC Swimming World Championships in Durban, South Africa Anderson won a silver medal in the Men's 100 m Backstroke S10 event. He competed in three events at the 2008 Beijing Games, winning a silver medal in the Men's 100 m Backstroke S10 event. He battled shoulder injuries around the time of the 2008 Beijing Games. He competed at the 2010 IPC Swimming World Championships in Eindhoven, Netherlands and did not win a medal. He has been an Australian Institute of Sport paralympic swimming scholarship holder.

At the 2012 London Paralympics, Anderson won a gold medal in the 4x100 m freestyle relay and a bronze medal in the 4x100 m medley relay. He also participated in the S10 class of the Men's 100 m Backstroke, 100 m Freestyle and 50 m Freestyle events. He was awarded an Order of Australia Medal in the 2014 Australia Day Honours "for service to sport as a Gold Medallist at the London 2012 Paralympic Games."

At the 2015 IPC Swimming World Championships, Glasgow, Scotland, he won a bronze medal in the Men's 4 × 100 m Freestyle Relay 34pts as a heat swimmer. He finished fourth in the Men's 4 × 100 m Medley Relay 34pts, sixth in the Men's 100m Backstroke S10, tenth in the Men's 50m Freestyle S10 and eleventh in the Men's 100m Freestyle S10.

In 2015, he was coached by Jan Cameron at the University of the Sunshine Coast and is a Queensland Academy of Sport Scholarship holder.

At the 2016 Rio Paralympic Games, Anderson competed in three events. He finished sixth in the final of Men's 100m backstroke S10, but didn't progress to the finals in Men's 50m Freestyle S10 and Men's 100m Freestyle S10.
