= 2005 Special Olympics World Winter Games =

Multi-sport event in Nagano, Japan

9th Special Olympics World Winter Games 第9回スペシャルオリンピックス世界冬季大会
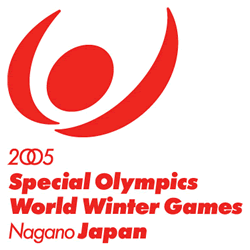
- Host city: Nagano, Nagano, Nippon
- Motto: Let's Celebrate Together! (Japanese: 一緒に祝いましょう!)
- Nations: 84
- Athletes: 2,600
- Events: 79 in 7 sports
- Opening: February 26
- Closing: March 5
- Opened by: Prime Minister Junichiro Koizumi
- Torch lighter: Ryuya Kamihara
- Main venue: M-Wave

Summer

Winter

The 2005 Special Olympics Winter World Games (Japanese: 2005年スペシャルオリンピックス冬季世界大会, romanized: 2005-Nen supesharuorinpikkusu tōki sekai taikai) were hosted at Nagano in Nippon and were the first Special Olympics World Games held in Asia. Nagano became the first city in the world to host the Olympics, Paralympics and Special Olympics World Games.

== Events ==
- Floor hockey
- Figure skating
- Speed skating
- Snowshoe
- Cross-country skiing
- Snowboarding
- Alpine skiing

== Venues ==
- M-Wave – the opening, closing ceremonies and Speed skating
- Big Hat – Figure skating
- White Ring – Floor hockey
- Yamanouchi – Alpine skiing
- Hakuba – Cross-country
- Nozawaonsen – Snowshoe
- Mure – Snowboarding

== See also ==
- 1998 Winter Olympics
- 1998 Winter Paralympics

Preceded by Anchorage, Alaska, United States	Special Olympics World Winter Games	Succeeded by Idaho, Boise, United States
