= 1995 Special Olympics World Summer Games =

Multi-sport event in New Haven, Connecticut, US

9th Special Olympics World Summer Games
- Host city: New Haven, United States
- Nations: 143
- Athletes: 7,000
- Events: 21 sports
- Opening: July 1, 1995
- Closing: July 10, 1995
- Opened by: Bill Clinton
- Main venue: Yale Bowl

Summer

Winter

The 1995 Special Olympics World Summer Games were held in New Haven, Connecticut, United States on July 1–9, 1995. More than 7,000 athletes from 143 countries gathered for competition in 21 sports. The opening and closing ceremonies were held in the Yale Bowl, and various events were held around the New Haven area, including various events held in West Haven, Connecticut. This was the first Special olympics world games that included unified sports. The hurdles and the marathon were included in athletics, squat lift was included in powerlifting, and the 40 km race was included in cycling.

Notable athletes and achievements of these games include:

- Jason Willoughby - won 2 silver and 2 bronze in gymnastics.
- Michael Traoré - won 1 gold, 2 silver and 1 bronze in running and soccer.
- Troy Rutter – won the first-ever marathon in 2:59.18.
- Kamala Gesteland – won 3 gold medals and 2 bronze medals in swimming.
- Holly Mandy – won the mile run and the 3 km run, also won silver medal in the half-marathon. (She also won a silver medal in the 5 km run at the 1991 world games.)
- Loretta Claiborne – won 2 gold medals in bowling events.
- Conrad DuPreez – won 2 gold medals in cycling.
- Edward Brown - won gold medal in cycling.
- Chad Kocabinski – won a gold and a bronze medal in equestrian events riding the American Quarter Horse mare Can Bea Scotch.
- Robert Vasquez – won 1 gold, 4 silver, and 1 bronze medals in gymnastics.
- Gabriel Salas – won gold and bronze medals in speed roller skating.
- Cynthia Bentley – won a silver medal in tennis.
- Jennifer R Delaney- won 2 gold and one silver medal in Equestrian
- Lori G Garver – won 3 gold medals in powerlifting
- Robert J McMullen, III - won 1 bronze medal in softball
- Stephen Farmer - won 3 gold medals in Track and Field for Team USA (Events include 100 meter wheelchair race, 400 meter wheelchair race and shotput, also landed on the front page for the New Haven Register the local newspaper and cover of the New Haven phonebook.)
- Mike DiMauro - won 2 gold medals & 1 silver medals in speed roller skating

== Sports ==
- Aquatics
- Athletics
- Badminton
- Basketball
- Bocce
- Bowling
- Cycling
- Equestrian
- Football (Soccer)
- Golf
- Gymnastics
- Powerlifting
- Roller skating
- Sailing
- Softball
- Table tennis
- Tennis
- Volleyball

Preceded by Minneapolis-Saint Paul, United States	Special Olympics World Summer Games	Succeeded by North Carolina, United States
