= Malle Juhkam =

Estonian para athletics competitor

Malle Jukham
Sport
- Country: Estonia
- Sport: Paralympic athletics
Medal record
Paralympic athletics
Representing Estonia
Paralympic Games
Bronze medal – third place	1996 Atlanta	Long jump MH

Malle Juhkam is a retired Estonian para athletics competitor, she competed in long jump.

At the 1996 Summer Paralympics in Atlanta, she won a bronze medal in the Women's long jump MH.
