= Eela Kokk =

Estonian para swimmer

Eela Kokk is an Estonian para swimmer.

At the 1996 Summer Paralympics in Atlanta, she won a silver medal in the Women's 50m freestyle MH (see Swimming at the 1996 Summer Paralympics).

== See also ==
- Estonia at the Paralympics
