= Külli Hallik =

Estonian skier and coach (born 1954)

Külli Hallik (until 1978 Mäesoo; born 9 August 1954) is an Estonian skier and coach.

She was born in Võru. In 1976 she graduated from University of Tartu's Institute of Physical Education.

She began her cross-country skiing career in 1967, coached by Laur and Maret Lukin. She is multiple-times Estonian champion in different skiing disciplines.

Since 1993 she is coaching at Nõmme Sport Club. Students: Piret Pormeister, Andres Kollo, Marko Kilp.
