= Janne Mugame =

Estonian para swimmer

Personal information
- Born: 10 March 1980 (age 46) Tallinn, then part of Estonian SSR, Soviet Union

Sport
- Country: Estonia
- Sport: Paralympic swimming
- Disability class: S14
Medal record
Paralympic swimming
Representing Estonia
Paralympic Games
Bronze medal – third place	2000 Sydney	50m backstroke S14
World Championships
Silver medal – second place	1998 Christchurch	50m backstroke S14
Bronze medal – third place	2002 Mar del Plata	100m breaststroke SB14

Janne Mugame (born 10 March 1980) is an Estonian retired para swimmer. At the 2000 Summer Paralympics in Sydney, she won a bronze medal in the Women's 50m backstroke S14
