= Allan Kiil =

Estonian politician (1963–2021)

Personal information
- Born: August 4, 1963 Tallinn, then part of Estonian SSR, Soviet Union
- Died: June 15, 2021 (aged 57) Tallinn, Estonia

Sport
- Sport: Swimming

Allan Kiil (4 August 1963 – 15 June 2021) was an Estonian butterfly, freestyle and medley swimmer and sport personality.

Kiil was born in Tallinn. In 1991 he graduated from Tallinn Pedagogical Institute in physical education.

Between 1981 and 1986 he was 22 times Estonian champion in different swimming events. From 1983 to 1985 he was a member of the Estonian national team.

From 1991 to 2013 he was the general secretary of the Estonian Paralympic Committee.

From 2004 to 2015 he was a member of the board of AS Tallinna Sadam.

Kiil died on 15 June 2021 at the age of 57.
