= Justin Zook =

American Paralympic swimmer

Medal record

Men's swimming

Representing United States

Paralympic Games
Gold medal – first place	2004 Athens	100 metre backstroke S10
Gold medal – first place	2008 Beijing	100 metre backstroke S10
Gold medal – first place	2012 London	100 metre backstroke S10
Bronze medal – third place	2004 Athens	50 metre freestyle S10

Justin Zook (born October 16, 1985 in Chicago, Illinois) is an American swimmer. He competed at the 2004, 2008 and 2012 Summer Paralympics, and also represented Springfield College in the NCAA Men's Swimming and Diving Championships.

Zook was born missing half his right foot and with non-functioning growth plates in his right leg; 30 operations lengthened his leg but caused nerve damage, muscle weakness and range of motion problems. He started swimming as physical therapy at age 6.

As of February 2013, Zook holds IPC world records for 100m and 200m backstroke events.
