= Nadežda Maksimova =

Estonian para swimmer

Nadežda Maksimova (born 17 April 1960) is an Estonian para swimmer.

She was born in Tallinn.

She started her swimming exercising in 1969. Her coach has been Rein Põldme. She participated on 1988, 1992 and 1996 Summer Paralympics. 1986–1990 she competed also at World Championships, and won several medals, including one gold medal. 1980–1990 she won many Estonian and Soviet Championships. 1980–1996 she was a member of Estonian national para swimming team.
