= Annely Ojastu =

Estonian Paralympic athlete

Personal information
- Born: 10 August 1960 (age 65) Tartu, then part of Estonian SSR, Soviet Union
Medal record
Women's para athletics
Representing Estonia
Paralympic Games
Gold medal – first place	1996 Atlanta	100 m T42–46
Silver medal – second place	1992 Barcelona	100 m TS4
Silver medal – second place	1996 Atlanta	200 m T42–46
Silver medal – second place	1996 Atlanta	Long Jump F42–46

Annely Ojastu (born 10 August 1960 in Tartu) is an Estonian Paralympic athlete. At the 1992 Barcelona Games, she won a silver medal in the Women's 100 m TS4 event. At the 1996 Atlanta Games, she won a gold medal in the Women's 100 m T42–46 event and two silver medals in the Women's 200 m T42–46 and Women's Long Jump F42–46 events.

Ojastu is the daughter of track and field athletes Eino Ojastu and Linda Ojastu (née Kepp). Her younger brother Aivar Ojastu was also a successful track and field athlete.
