= Helena Kannus =

Estonian para athletics competitor

Helena Kannus (née Silm; married name Thalson; born 16 March 1963) is an Estonian para athletics competitor.

She was born in Tallinn. In 1988 she graduated from the special school Tartu Emajõgi School.

She started her sporting exercising in 1980. Until 1988 she exercised swimming under the guidance of Rein Põldme. Since 1992 she started to exercise athletics. She is competed at paralympic games from 1992 to 2004. At the 1996 Summer Paralympics in Atlanta, she won a bronze medal in the Women's pentathlon P10-12 (see Athletics at the 1996 Summer Paralympics). In 1998 she won athletics championships for athletes with bad eyesight; she won at two disciplines: pentathlon and long jump. 1992–2004 she was a member of Estonian national para athletics team.
