= Toomas Vilosius =

Estonian politician (born 1951)

Minister of Social Affairs
- In office 20 September 1994 – 1 May 1995
- Prime Minister: Mart Laar; Andres Tarand; Tiit Vähi
- Preceded by: Marju Lauristin
- Succeeded by: Siiri Oviir
- In office 6 November 1995 – 1 December 1996
- Prime Minister: Tiit Vähi
- Preceded by: Siiri Oviir
- Succeeded by: Tiiu Aro

Personal details
- Born: 5 May 1951 (age 74)

Toomas Vilosius (born 5 May 1951) is an Estonian politician and a former Minister of Social Affairs of Estonia. He is currently the communications manager of Silja Line.

Preceded by Marju Lauristin	Minister of Social Affairs of Estonia; 20 September 1994 – 1 May 1995	Succeeded by Siiri Oviir
Preceded by Siiri Oviir	Minister of Social Affairs of Estonia; 6 November 1995 – 1 December 1996	Succeeded by Tiiu Aro
