= Sirly Tiik =

Estonian Paralympic athlete

Personal information
- Born: 4 September 1974 (age 51) Tallinn, then part of Estonian SSR, Soviet Union
Medal record
Women's para athletics
Representing Estonia
Paralympic Games
Gold medal – first place	2000 Sydney	Javelin F20
Bronze medal – third place	2000 Sydney	High Jump F20
Bronze medal – third place	2000 Sydney	Shot Put F20

Sirly Tiik (born 4 September 1974 in Tallinn) is an Estonian Paralympic athlete with an intellectual disability. At the 2000 Sydney Paralympics, she won a gold medal in the Women's Javelin F20 event and two bronze medals in the Women's High Jump F20 and Women's Shot Put F20 events. She received a letter from Estonian President Lennart Meri for her achievement.
