= Are Eller =

Estonian sport journalist and rower

Are Eller (born 23 November 1947 in Rakke) is an Estonian sport personnel, sport journalist and canoer.

In the 1960s and 1970 he won 36 gold medals in the Estonian championships in canoeing. From 1964 until 1975, he was a member of Estonian national team.

From 1979 until 1992, he was a reporter for Eesti Televisioon. Since 1984 he has been a host of television series Mootorite maailmas. Since 1992 he is a freelance sport journalist.

Since 1994 he has been a member of Estonian delegation in the Paralympic Games.

In 2018 he was awarded with Order of the White Star, V class.
