= Marge Kõrkjas =

Estonian Paralympic swimmer

Personal information
- Nationality: Estonia
- Born: 8 May 1974 (age 52) Rakvere, then part of Estonian SSR, Soviet Union
Medal record
Swimming
Paralympic Games
Gold medal – first place	1996 Atlanta	Women's 50 m Freestyle B2
Gold medal – first place	1996 Atlanta	Women's 100 m Freestyle B2
Silver medal – second place	1992 Barcelona	Women's 50 m Freestyle B2
Silver medal – second place	1996 Atlanta	Women's 50 m Freestyle B2
Silver medal – second place	2000 Sydney	Women's 50 m Freestyle S12
Silver medal – second place	2004 Athens	Women's 50 m Freestyle S12
Bronze medal – third place	1992 Barcelona	Women's 100 m Freestyle B2

Marge Kõrkjas (born 8 May 1974) is an Estonian Paralympic swimmer with a vision impairment, who has won seven medals at four Paralympics.

== Competitive career ==
Born in Rakvere, Kõrkjas first participated at the Paralympics at the 1992 Barcelona Games, where she won a silver medal in the Women's 50 m Freestyle B2 event and a bronze medal in the Women's 100 m Freestyle B2 event. To prepare for the 1996 Games, she trained with able-bodied swimmers, saying of this "They went into a constant uproar. We got to train at the same time, slowly and quietly, no-one noticed us." Her coach going into Atlanta was Rein Põldme. The city of Tartu contributed 10,000 krooni a year to the Kullman swimming pool where Kõrkjas trained to rent it out for use by children and disabled swimmers, but shortly before the start of the Paralympics, they discontinued funding as the pool requested an increase to 50,000 krooni a year for continued use of the pool. At the Games, she won two gold medals in the Women's 50 m Freestyle B2 and Women's 100 m Freestyle B2 events and a silver medal in the Women's 100 m Backstroke B2 event. Her medal haul helped Estonia to finish 32nd out of the 124 countries that competed. She carried the Estonian flag during the closing ceremony.

At the 2000 Sydney Paralympics, she won a silver medal in the Women's 50 m Freestyle S12 event. At the 2004 Athens Paralympics, she won a silver medal in the Women's 50 m Freestyle S12 event. Many colleagues at her workplace were unaware of her success in the pool until after she returned from the Games. In honour of her success, the Estonian government awarded her 100,000 krooni (about 6,400 euros). Following the Athens Games, she also had a reception at the Tartu Town Hall. Following the 2004 Games, she was not sure if she would try to represent the country at the 2008 Paralympics.

She is Estonia's most decorated Paralympian in terms of total medals.

When the government was talking about changing the laws, she was part of a discussion about extending benefits the country applies to Olympians to Paralympians. She is viewed as a role model for other competitors in the country.
