= Vilma Nugis =

Estonian para skier (1958–2024)

Vilma Nugis (8 October 1958 – 7 December 2024) was an Estonian para skier.

At the 1994 Winter Paralympics in Lillehammer, she won a bronze medal in the Women's 5km free technique B3 (see Cross-country skiing at the 1994 Winter Paralympics).

Nugis died on 7 December 2024, at the age of 66.
