= Kardo Ploomipuu =

Estonian Paralympic swimmer

Personal information
- Born: 24 March 1988 (age 38) Pärnu, then part of Estonian SSR, Soviet Union
- Height: 188 cm (6 ft 2 in)
- Weight: 81 kg (179 lb)
Medal record
Men's para swimming (S10)
Representing Estonia
Paralympic Games
Bronze medal – third place	2008 Beijing	100 m backstroke S10
IPC World Championships (LC)
Silver medal – second place	2010 Eindhoven	100 m backstroke S10
Bronze medal – third place	2013 Montreal	100 m backstroke S10
IPC World Championships (SC)
Silver medal – second place	2009 Rio de Janeiro	100 m backstroke S10
IPC European Championships
Gold medal – first place	2009 Reykjavík	100 m backstroke S10
Gold medal – first place	2011 Berlin	100 m backstroke S10
Gold medal – first place	2016 Funchal	100 m backstroke S10
Silver medal – second place	2014 Eindhoven	100 m backstroke S10

Kardo Ploomipuu (born 24 March 1988 in Pärnu) is an Estonian swimmer.

His first Paralympics was the 2004 Athens Games. He is the current IPC European record holder in 50 and 100 m backstroke (long course; S10).

== Achievements ==
Year	Competition	Venue	Position	Time	Event
2002	IPC World Championships	Mar del Plata, Argentina	14th	30.54	50 m freestyle S10
2004	Paralympic Games	Athens, Greece	8th	1:08.99	100 m backstroke S10
2006	IPC World Championships	Durban, South Africa	4th	1:05.38	100 m backstroke S10
2006	IPC World Championships	Durban, South Africa	17th	27.23	50 m freestyle S10
2008	Paralympic Games	Beijing, China	3rd	1:03.37	100 m backstroke S10
2009	IPC European Championships	Reykjavík, Iceland	1st	1:01.03 WR	100 m backstroke S10
2009	IPC World Championships (25 m)	Rio de Janeiro, Brazil	2nd	58.05 ER	100 m backstroke S10
2010	IPC World Championships	Eindhoven, Netherlands	2nd	1:01.29	100 m backstroke S10
2010	IPC World Championships	Eindhoven, Netherlands	16th	26.47	50 m freestyle S10
2011	IPC European Championships	Berlin, Germany	1st	1:01.89	100 m backstroke S10
2012	Paralympic Games	London, Great Britain	4th	1:01.32	100 m backstroke S10
2012	Paralympic Games	London, Great Britain	18th	26.50	50 m freestyle S10
2013	IPC World Championships	Montreal, Canada	3rd	1:00.85 ER	100 m backstroke S10
