= Estonian Paralympic Committee =

National Paralympic Committee of Estonia

National Paralympic Committee
- Country: Estonia
- Code: EST
- Created: 1991
- Recognized: ?
- Headquarters: Tallinn, Estonia
- President: Monika Haukanõmm
- Secretary General: Allan Kiil
- Website: http://www.paralympic.ee

Estonian Paralympic Committee (Estonian: Eesti Paraolümpiakomitee) was founded in April 1991.

== Members ==
Members (as of 2021):

- Eesti Invaspordi Liit
- Eesti Pimedate Spordiliit
- Eesti Vaimsete Puuetega Inimeste Spordiliit
- Estonian Deaf Sport Union (Estonian: Eesti Kurtide Spordiliit)
- Eesti Puuetega Inimeste Ujumisliit
