= Dawn Elder =

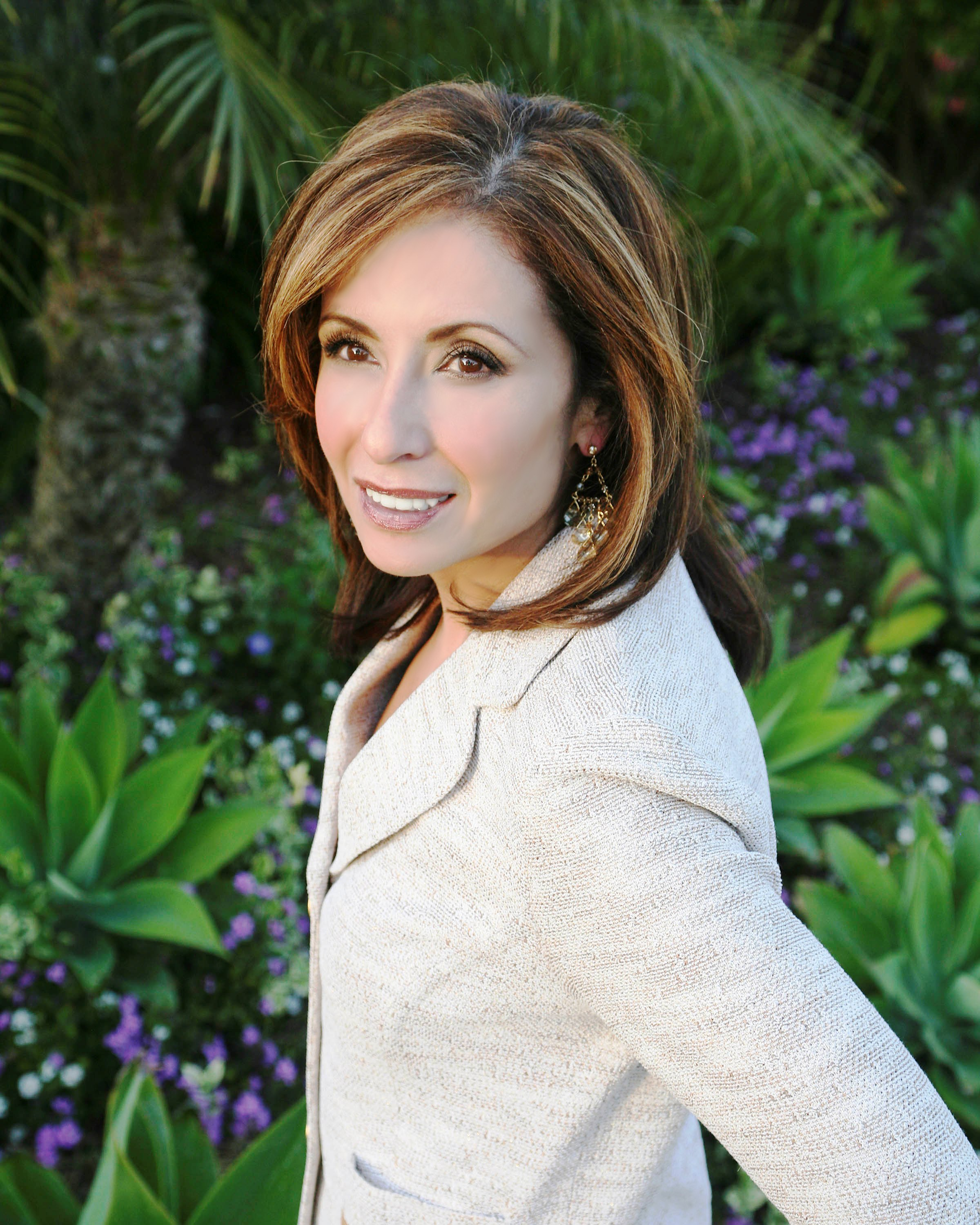
- Dawn Elder in 2009

Background information
- Born: San Francisco
- Genres: Pop, Arabic music, world
- Occupations: Record producer, songwriter, impresario, pianist, live events/TV producer
- Instrument: Piano
- Years active: 1980s-present
- Labels: De Music, Ark 21/Mondo Melodia, CIA, Six Degrees, Universal, Virgin, Sony, etc.
- Website: Dawn Elder Management

Dawn Elder (San Francisco, California) is an American composer, pianist, impresario, music producer, and promoter best known for her efforts to fuse Middle Eastern music with contemporary rock and pop music. In the 1980s she began working as an impresario and promoter, music producer, record executive and or representative for diverse artists. She spent several years as the vice president of Ark 21/Mondo Melodia starting in 1999, and she has helped produce albums with Sting, Cheb Mami, Simon Shaheen Qantara, and Cheb Khaled. After her work at Ark 21, Elder founded Dawn Elder World Media & Entertainment Enterprises, an entertainment firm based in California.

Elder has developed and directed specials by networks such as ABC, NBC, PBS, MTV, and NPR. She founded the annual International Friendship Festival in California, Peace Through Music, Team Up America, and several other cultural festivals and conferences in the United States. In 2012 Elder co-founded the label World Harmony Studios and DE Music in Santa Barbara. That year Elder brought together Voices of Afghanistan, an Afghan ensemble featuring vocalist Ustad Farida Mahwash, rubab master Homayoun Sakhi, and The Sakhi Ensemble, Angelique Kidjo, and other notable artists, and helped compose several tracks on the group's debut album.

She was the international talent advisor to the MasterPeace concert in 2014, also co-writing the Arabic adaptation of the Bob Seger song "Turn the Page," which was performed at the Concert of Colors. Among other events, in 2014 and 2015 she created the concept for and "masterminded" the When Music Matters concert as the finale of the larger Abu Dhabi Festival. A periodic public speaker, she continues to manage and teach at the Ultimate Music and Vocal Summit, a children's vocal and music educational program she founded in 2015.

== Early life, education ==
Dawn Elder was born and raised in San Francisco, California. She is of Middle Eastern and Mediterranean ancestry; her mother is from Lebanon, while her father is of Palestinian descent. Elder was named after the Lebanese diva Sabah, whose first name means "early morning" in Arabic. Elder listened to rock and roll, and studied classical piano. Elder attended the University of California, Berkeley in the early 1980s, pursuing a double degree in biochemistry and music. She took a hiatus to direct and produce a series of festivals, artists, and events in Santa Barbara, California promoting world, Latin and rock artists. She later graduated from the University of California with a degree in Music Education.

== Career ==
=== Early management, festivals (1990–1995) ===
In 1990 Elder began representing American actor Woody Harrelson. A year later she helped direct and produce the Halloween ABC Special – Woody Harrelson on ABC, one of her first television jobs. Also in 1990 she began working with Mike Love from The Beach Boys, and two years later she started managing his son Christian Love and his musical group Alex's Cane. She also worked for Arlo Guthrie on a two-year project. In 1991 she started developing and co-organizing the first bi-annual conference T.E.A.M EXPO, which drew 100,000 participants. With the name standing for 'Teaching. Entertainment. Arts. Music.,' she worked with the T.E.A.M. organization until 2000.

Elder produced the first P.A.T.H.E.S. Festival, which was sponsored by the Preservation of Artistic Traditional Heritage Entertainment Society, in May 1995. According to the Los Angeles Times about the events, "when Latin rock took off as a popular strain in California music, [Elder] pioneered a Spanish dance festival and concert events to celebrate the Latino history of the Central Coast." Also in 1995, Elder coordinated the Project Teach Tomorrow's Teachers scholarship program, working with Mike Love on fundraising concerts. In 1995 she also became artistic manager and representative for bands such as George Clinton and Parliament-Funkadelic. By the end of 1995 she had produced hundreds of concerts and festivals, including programming the entertainment for the US Latin world festival Old Spanish Days.

=== International Friendship Festival (1996) ===
Elder is the founder of the International Friendship Festival in California. The origin of the project was in late 1996, when songwriter Michael Sembello asked Elder for help planning a Santa Maria video shoot for his song "One Planet One People." The project expanded, and the Los Angeles Times states "What became known as the International Friendship Festival aspired to bring to one California venue as many ethnicities and bands as possible." Also in the mid-1990s, Elder was introduced to Arab composer musician Simon Shaheen and such groups as the Kan Zaman Community Ensemble in Arcadia, an "all-volunteer Arabic orchestra" who create symphonic sounds based on ancient musical traditions. She also learned that her namesake Sabah was visiting Los Angeles. When Elder mentioned she was "trying to introduce Arabic music to a massive L.A. audience," Sabah offered to perform for free. For the first event, the LA Times stated "Sabah assembled an all-Arab American orchestra to back her up, performed to a packed Southern California crowd and added her voice, along with the Kan Zaman players, to a live rendition of Sembello's song about global oneness. The moving event was a turning point in Elder's career, and a milestone for L.A.'s Arab American community." She continues to organize the events.

=== Televised programs and Ark 21 (1997–2003) ===
She helped on the One Planet One People global broadcast and PBS special from 1997 to 1998, and also in 1998 she worked on the first Arab-American Music, Arts, and Literature (AMAL) Awards, with over 50,000 attendees at the live broadcast and events in Washington D.C. Also in the 1990s she started producing and managing artists such as Sabah, Wadi al-Safi, Michael Sembello, The Bridge, Simon Shaheen, Mohammed Wardi, George Clinton and the P-Funk, Cheb Khaled, Cheb Mami, and certain projects for Stevie Wonder. Elder helped arrange and co-produce the 1998 album Mohammed Wardi with the African Birds by Sudanese singer-songwriter Mohammed Wardi, which won a National Award of Excellence. The following year she produced a second album by Wardi, titled Longing for Home. In 1999, she created and produced the Debka for Peace event in Los Angeles, which focused on the Arab folk dance debka. Featuring the Adam Basma Dance Company, the televised version won a Tele Award.

In 1999, Ark 21/Mondo Melodia CEO Miles Copeland hired Elder as the label's vice-president, and she brought a number of her artists to the label. The following year she began producing a large number of albums on Ark 21, starting with Historic Live Recording of Arabic Masters by Two Tenors & Qantara (Wadi al-Safi and Sabah), The Lion Roars Live (Hakim), and Blue Flame (Simon Shaheen & Qantara). She recorded, arranged, and produced the albums, also serving as executive producer and directing the live TV broadcast for Historic Live Recording of Arabic Masters. That year she also was the executive producer on an album by Kazem Al Saher. She also continued to work on non-Ark 21 albums. Among other projects, in 2000 she stated managing a US concert project for Lebanese singer Fairuz, as well as cultural projects for Sting.

=== Production and songwriting (2001–2004) ===
In 2001 her Ark 21 productions included an album by Hakim, The Lion Roars. Other Ark 21 albums she produced in 2001 included Nomad: Best of Amina by Amina Annabi, Blue Flame by Simon Shaheen and Qantara, and Dellali by Cheb Mami, which peaked at #7 on Top World Music Albums chart. Also in 2001 she was executive producer on the compilation Desert Roses and Arabian Rhythms, Vol. 1, and Desert Roses and Arabian Rhythms, Vol. 2 in 2002 as well. According to The Boston Phoenix in 2001, "this past summer, two savvy world-music labels, Putumayo and Six Degrees, released Arabic-music samplers. But most of the credit for the Arabic-music boom has to go to the California-based Ark 21 imprint Mondo Melodia."

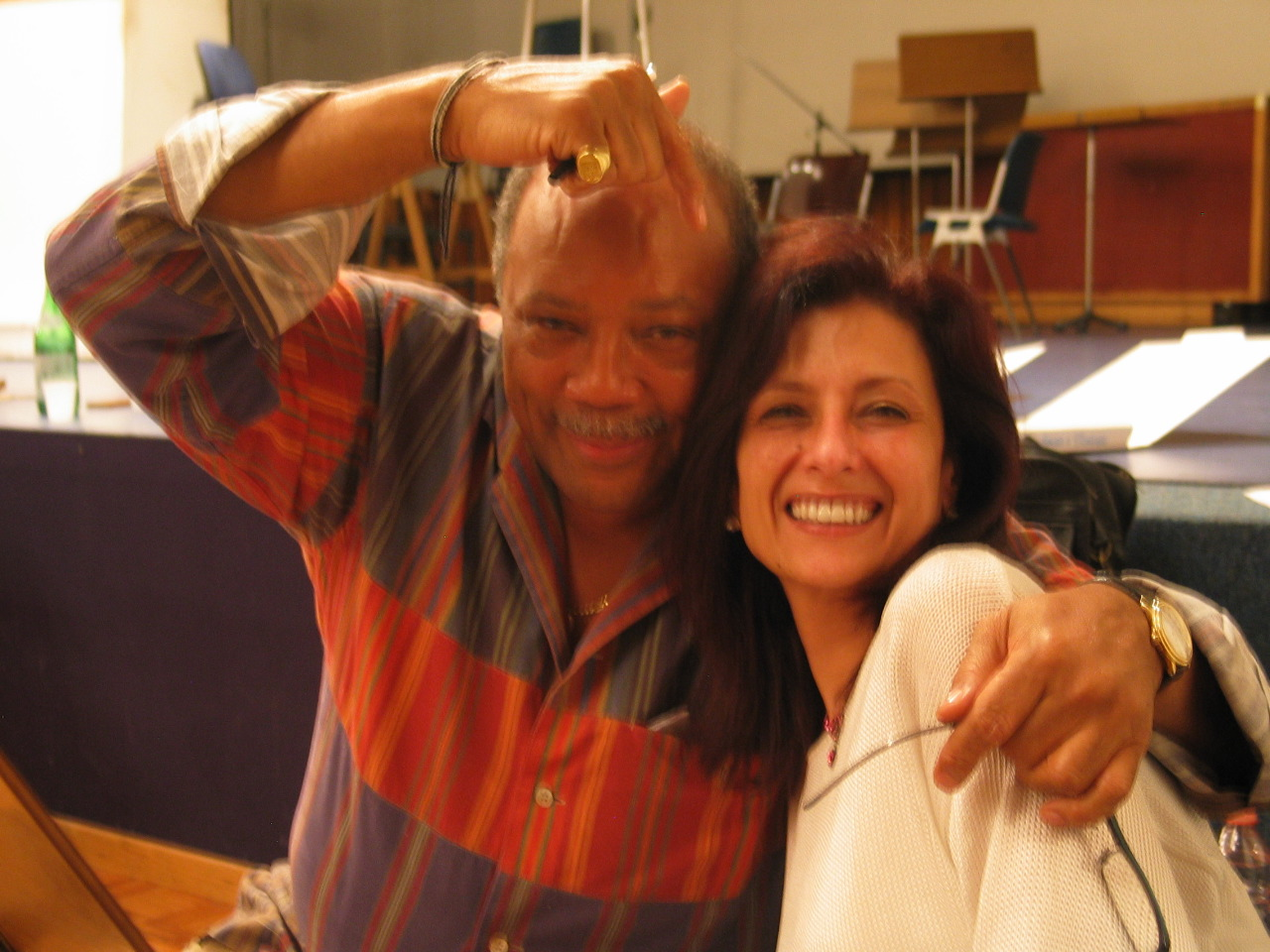
Elder and Quincy Jones in Rome

In 2001 she also developed and produced the first United States tour and release for Raoui by Algerian musician Souad Massi. Also that year, she was traveling in the United States with eighteen musicians, about to embark on a ten-city US tour with Khaled and Hakim, when the tour was cancelled because of 9/11. She stated the celebratory nature of the tour would have been inappropriate, and travel had become unsafe. The tour was successfully rescheduled for February 2002. Also in 2002 she started managing special projects for Quincy Jones, assisting him in coordinating the inclusion of Middle Eastern artists into the World Economic Forum. She worked with Quincy Jones again in 2004 to coordinate including world artists into We Are the Future, a program of performances in Rome including artists such as Khaled of Algeria, Kadim Al Sahir of Iraq, Simon Shaheen of Palestine, and Riffat Sultana of Pakistan. It was broadcast live on several international networks, including MTV. Elder also co-wrote with Rod Temperton the lyrics to a composition by Simon Shaheen ("Everyone Everywhere") originally written as an instrumental piece for the United Nations.

In 2003, she co-wrote the song "Love and Compassion," which featured Kazem Al Sahir performing his first English and Arabic song with Paula Cole and Karina Pasian. She co-produced the song with KC Porter. The track was featured on the CD Love and Compassion by the National Arab American Museum, which Elder compiled. She also co-produced “We Want Peace,” featuring Lenny Kravitz, Kazem Al Sahir, Simon Shaheen and Jamey Haddad. Originally, the Redondo Beach-based youth organization Rock The Vote released the track in February 2003. It was re-released in 2006, and Elder produced for the Rock the Vote and the Olympics CD it was included on.

=== "Love to the People" and events (2005–2011) ===
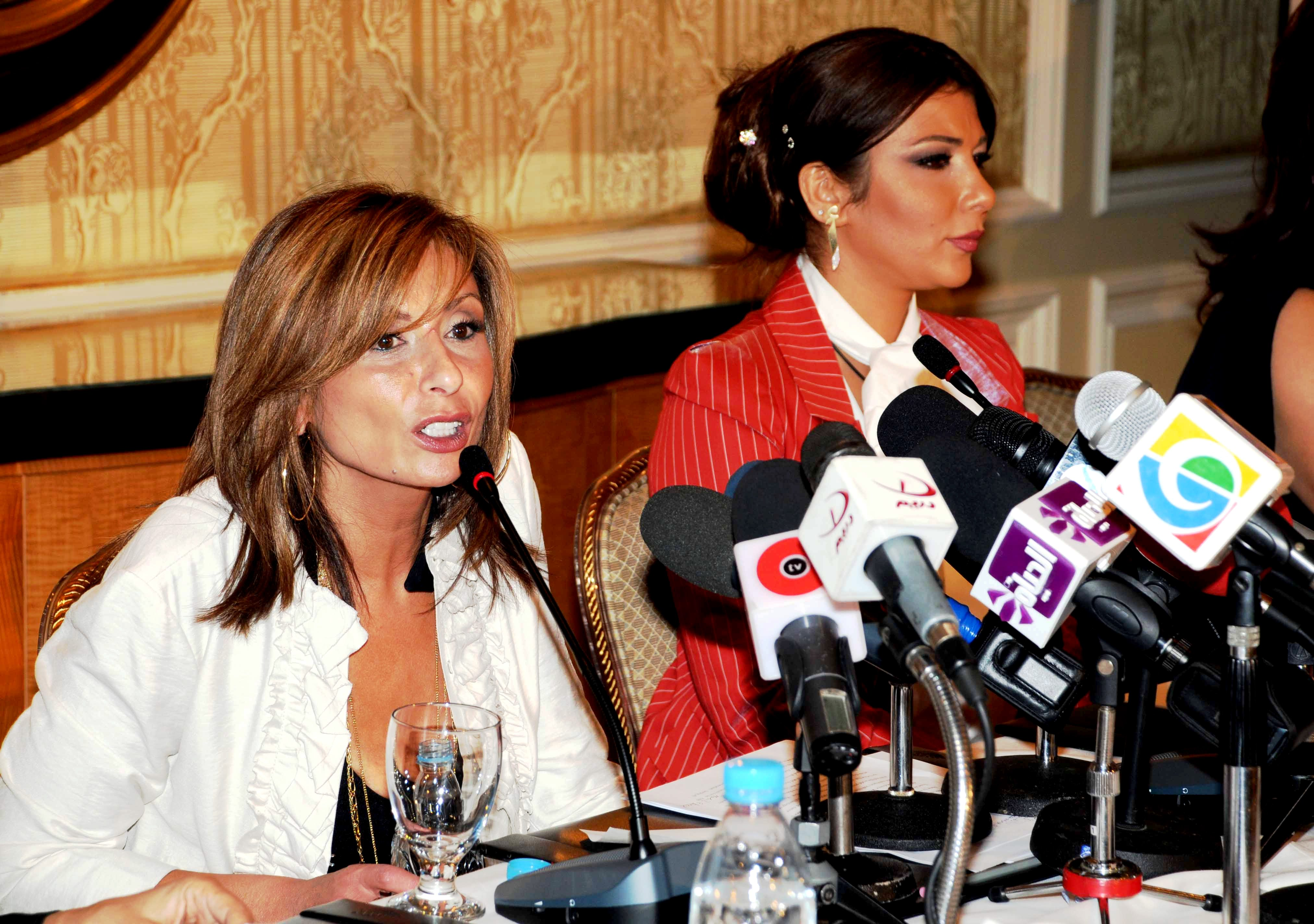
Dawn Elder at a Press conference in Egypt with Syrian singer Assala Nasri (2009)

"Today, American pop stars are embracing these foreign musical styles, due in no small part to Elder's prodding. Hybrid sounds like [in her track "Love to the People"] typify a new style of American ethnic fusion that's largely emanating from California."
— Los Angeles Times

In 2004 she co-produced the album Ya-Rayi by Cheb Khaled, and that year she also started working with Def Jam recording artist Karina Pasian, DJ Cheb i Sabbah, and Bassam Saba. Elder was an executive producer, co-producer, and co-writer on the 2005 song "Love to the People," a duet between Carlos Santana and Algerian vocalist Cheb Khaled. The Los Angeles Times called the track "American ethnic fusion," and "Love to the People"'s album Peace Through Music was nominated for a Grammy. She co-founded Ultimate Music and Vocal Summit program in 2005, which offers "mentorship, vocal and music industry coaching, songwriting, performance and producing" for children looking to pursue careers as vocalists. ABC News dubbed Elder one of the most influential producers of her time in 2006.

From 2007 to 2008 she co-conceived and produced The Sudanese Music & Dance Festival, which brought together Sudanese artists from diverse regions to perform in New York, Detroit, and Chicago, including for free at Central Park Summerstage. After managing Enzo Avitabile, in 2008 she produced a music special for StaytunedTV. In 2009 she began handling special projects in the Middle East for Jennifer Lopez, and also organized the event SAHRA in association with the National Arab Medical Association. Featuring artists such as Khaled, Assala Nasri and Rida Al Abdullah, funds were raised for Children's Medical Aid in the Middle East. In 2010 she organized and co-produced all the international artists for a recording and video shot at the Capitol Recording Studios entitled Citizens of the World with US producer Spencer Proffer, with artists such as Cheng Lin brought on.

Elder organized the Citizens of the World event in 2010 as well, followed in 2011 with the first concert in the Middle East for Quincy Jones' Global Gumbo All Stars. She also co-produced the All Stars' song project "Tomorrow-Bokra." On November 21, 2009, MGM Grand and Dawn Elder World Entertainment presented the world premier of their Sahra multi-media event, intended to showcase Arabic culture. The event was headlined by Khaled, Assala Nasri, and Rida Al Abdulla, with performances by K.C. Porter and Karina Pasian, and held at the MGM Grand Garden Arena. In support of Universal Children's Day, all profits went to children's charities in the Middle East and North Africa, particularly NAAMA Foundation (National Arab American Medical Association) and ACCESS (Arab Community Center for Economic and Social Services).

=== Dawn Elder World Media, Voices of Afghanistan (2012–2013) ===
After her work at Ark 21, Elder founded Dawn Elder World Media & Entertainment Enterprises, an entertainment firm based in California. As one of her first projects with the new company, in 2012 she worked with Phil Ramone, Don Was, and Sam Nappi to organize the One World Concert. The event was opened by the Dalai Lama in the Carrier Dome, and had around 27,000 attendees. Elder wrote one of the main songs, "A New Day on the Horizon," which was introduced by Whoopi Goldberg and performed by TEAL-ONE 97, a band of young Middle Eastern artists. She also coordinated the performance of Afghan artist Ustad Farida Mahwash at the event, which was seen by 44 million viewers. She was a co-producer for the 2012 compilation album Desert Sunsets: World Fusion Rhythm & Grooves. In 2013 Elder adapted the lyrics for the Arabic version of "White Rabbit" on the American Hustle Soundtrack, bringing in then-unknown vocalist Mayssa Karaa to sing the main line. Song producer Mark Batson has suggested using non-English lyrics, and the film's music supervisor contacted Elder. The album went on to be nominated for a Grammy Award for best compilation soundtrack.

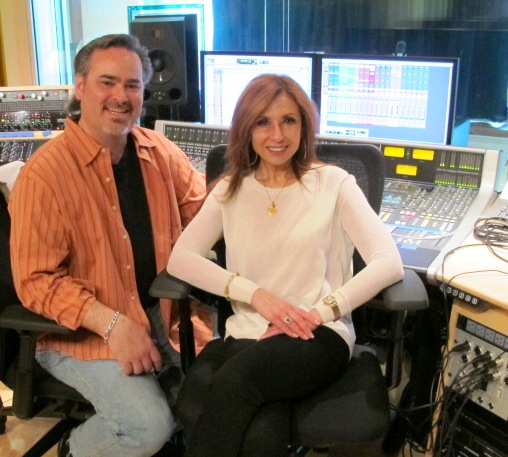
Dawn Elder and engineer Pat MacDougall recording Voices of Afghanistan

In 2012 Elder and Sam Nappi founded World Harmony Studios-DE Music Records in New York and California. That year Elder brought together Voices of Afghanistan, an Afghan ensemble featuring vocalist Ustad Farida Mahwash, rubab master Homayoun Sakhi, and The Sakhi Ensemble. The group focuses on contemporary music and "a blend of ghazals, Afghan folk songs imbued with Sufi mysticism." They had their first tour in the fall of 2012, and performed at The One World Concert, which was opened by the Dalai Lama. The group's 2013 debut album, Love Songs for Humanity, was recorded with Elder and Sam Nappi at World Harmony Studios, and Elder helped compose several of the tracks. According to NPR, Love Songs for Humanity "is a mix of Central Asian art music, folklore and classic popular songs."

=== Recent projects (2014–2016) ===
As of 2014, Elder was developing several new festivals, along with continued work with artists including Assala Nasri, Simon Shaheen, Kadim Al Sahir, Alphonso Johnson, Bassam Saba & the New York Arab Orchestra, Ustad Farida Mahwash, Voices of Afghanistan, Enzo Avitabile, Amina, Souad Massi, and others. In May, she collaborated with Quincy Jones on the Global Gumbo Group in Association with Dawn Elder music group. The group performed in Morocco with musicians such as Siedah Garrett, Naturally 7, Patti Austin, Alfredo Rodriguez, Paulinho da Costa, Richard Bona and Lionel Loueke.

As of 2014 she is working, writing and producing two new albums and an event for MasterPeace featuring international celebrities. She was the international talent advisor to the MasterPeace concert that year, and Dawn Elder World Entertainment produced the event, bringing in artists such as Riffat Sultana, Assala Nasri, Andy to perform on September 21, 2014. In 2014, Elder and Hanin Omar co-wrote the Arabic adaptation of the Bob Seger song "Turn the Page." The song was performed at the Concert of Colors at Orchestra Hall in Detroit, on July 7, 2014.

In 2015, she created the concept for and "masterminded" the When Music Matters concert as the finale of the larger Abu Dhabi Festival, an arts festival and cultural festival that "aims to promote cross-cultural understanding and support regional cultural production." Serving as artistic and music producer for the event, she booked artists such as Marcus Nand to perform the concerts, as well as a variety of world music artists. In 2016 she co-wrote the track "Only Human," recorded by musician Ty Waters, along with Waters, Michael Jay, and Randy Waldman. Elder recorded and produced the track along with others such as Waldman and Kenny Aronoff. Waters had previously graduated from the Ultimate Vocal Music Summit.

== Ultimate Vocal Music Summit ==
Elder cofounded the Ultimate Music and Vocal Summit in 2005. The program offers "mentorship, vocal and music industry coaching, songwriting, performance and producing" for children looking to pursue careers as vocalists. Each summit lasts three to five days, with a team of coaches offering both classes and individualized sessions at CenterStaging studios in Burbank, California. Vocalists are also filmed performing with a live band. The first summit had keynote speakers such as Rickey Minor and Kenny Aronoff. She also co-founded and joined the Titanium Arts Collective, leading a group of producers, music executives, musicians, vocalists and celebrity vocal coaches who teach the curriculum of the Ultimate Music and Vocal Summit. Vocal coaches have included Seth Riggs, Margareta Svensson Riggs, and the late Jeannie Deva among others.

== Personal life ==
Dawn Elder is based in Santa Barbara as of 2006, though she frequently travels internationally for work.

== Awards and nominations ==
Year	Award	Nominated work	Category	Result
2015	Grammy Awards	American Hustle soundtrack	Best Compilation Soundtrack for Visual Media	Nominated
2024	Hollywood Independent Music Awards	Two Hands	Producer/Production	Nominated

== Discography ==
=== Albums ===
Incomplete list of production credits for Dawn Elder
Yr	Release title	Primary artist(s)	Label	Notes, role
1998	Mohammed Wardi with the African Birds	Mohammed Wardi		Arranger, co-producer, executive producer. Album won National Award of Excellence
1999	Longing for Home	Mohammed Wardi		Producer
2000	Historic Live Recording of Arabic Masters: Two Tenors & Qantara	Wadi al-Safi, Sabah Fakhri	Ark 21	Recorded, arranged, produced, and executive produced, and directed live TV broadcast
2000	The Impossible Love (Al Hob Al Mustaheel)	Kazem Al Saher	Ark 21	Executive producer
2001	The Lion Roars: Live in America	Hakim	Ark 21/Mondo Melodia	Producer and executive producer
2001	Shabaz	Shabaz	Ark 21/Mondo Melodia	Executive producer
2001	Raoui	Souad Massi	Wrasse Records	Unknown role
2001	Nomad: Best of Amina	Amina	Ark 21/Mercury	Executive producer
2001	Dellali (#7 on Top World Music Albums)	Cheb Mami	Ark 21/Virgin	Executive producer
2001	Blue Flame	Simon Shaheen, Qantara	Ark 21/Universal	Producer, executive producer
2001	Desert Roses and Arabian Rhythms, Vol. 1	Various	Ark 21	Executive producer, producer
2002	Desert Roses and Arabian Rhythms, Vol. 2	Various	Ark 21	Executive producer
2004	Ya-Rayi	Khaled	Universal	Audio producer, associate/executive producer
2008	Devotion	DJ Cheb i Sabbah	Six Degrees	Management
2012	Desert Sunsets: World Fusion Rhythm & Grooves	Various	CIA	Producer
2013	Love Songs for Humanity	Voices of Afghanistan	De Music	Producer/executive producer, composer
2022	Cheb Khaled	Khaled	Aalia Publishing	Producer

=== Singles ===
Incomplete list of songs with contributions by Dawn Elder
Year	Title	Album	Primary artist	Certifications, role
1997	"One Planet One People"	Citizens of the World DVD	Michael Sembello	Co-producer
2003	"Love and Compassion"	Love and Compassion	Paula Cole, Karina Pasian, Kadim Al Sahir	Co-producer, co-writer
2005	"Everyone Everywhere"	United Nations	Simon Shaheen	Co-wrote lyrics with Rod Temperton
2005	"Love to the People"	Peace through Music	Carlos Santana, Cheb Khaled	Producer, executive, co-writer
2006	"We Want Peace"	Rock the Vote and the Olympics	Lenny Kravitz, Kadim Al Sahir, Simon Shaheen, Jamey Haddad	Producer
2010	"Citizens of the World"	Citizens of the World	Kailash Kher, Cheng Lin, King Sunny Ade, Khaled, Flying Machines	Associate producer
2011	"Tomorrow-Bokra" (Arabic)	Single only	Various	Producer
2012	"New Day on the Horizon"	New Day on the Horizon	Teal-One97	Composer, producer
2013	"White Rabbit"	American Hustle Soundtrack	Mayssa Karaa	Lyric adaptations
2016	"Turn the Page"	Pete Seger Cover	Concert of Colors	Lyric adaptations
2016	"Only Human"	Ty Waters	Co-writer and co-producer	
2019	"You, Me and My Purple Docs"	You, Me and My Purple Docs	Alexa Swinton	Producer
2020	"Happy As I Wanna Be"	Happy As I Wanna Be	Alexa Swinton	Producer

== Television production ==
Elder has directed, developed, or produced for the following television features:

- 1989–1996: Old Spanish Days (ABC, KEYT)
- 1989–2000: Kenny Loggins's Christmas Unity Telethon (ABC, KEYT)
- 1991: Halloween ABC Special – Woody Harrelson (ManlyMoon Dog)
- 1995-to present: International Friendship Festivals (annual event)
- 1997–1998: One Planet One People (global broadcast, PBS special)
- 1999: AMAL Awards: Arab American Music, Arts and Literary Awards: live from the Ronald Reagan Building, DC (ANA/MBC)
- 2000: The Two Tenors of Arabic Music (LBC International)
- 2003: Kazem Al Saher and Sarah Brightman (LBC International)
- 2005: Khaled & Friends featuring Carlos Santana (CBS special)
- 2007, 2008: Sudan Its Music and Its Arts (Link TV/Amnesty International TV/NPR/BBC TV special)
- 2010: SAHRA – World Special (MGM Grand-Mirage, various networks)
- 2010: Citizen of the World (PBS special)
- 2014: Sahra (MGM Grand-Mirage, various networks)
