= Yawmyat Rajoul Mahzoom =

Studio album by Kathem Al Saher
- Released: March 29, 2007
- Recorded: Cairo, Dubai, Beirut
- Genre: Arabic Pop, Classical Arabic
- Length: 65:00
- Label: Rotana

Kathem Al Saher chronology
Entaha al Mushwar (2005)	Yawmyat Rajoul Mahzoom (2007)	Souwar – Pictures (2008)

Yawmyat Rajoul Mahzoom (Diary of a Defeated Man) is the eighteenth album by Kadim Al Sahir, released on March 29, 2007. This album contains many songs from the poet Nizar Qabbani.

== Track listing ==
#	Title
1	"Yawmyat Rajoul Mahzoom"
2	"Takhi Jeth"
3	"Erdi Koududaha"
4	"Atouhabini"
5	"Houb"
6	"Ghali"
7	"Berreed Beruth"
8	"Ensa'a"
9	"Madinath Al Hob"
10	"Edhak"
