= Souwar – Pictures =

Souwar

Studio album by Kadim Al Sahir
- Released: September 30, 2008
- Recorded: Cairo, Dubai, Beirut
- Genre: Arabic Pop; Classical Arabic
- Length: 65:00 min
- Label: Rotana

Kadim Al Sahir chronology
| Yawmyat Rajoul Mahzoom (2007) | Souwar (2008) | Al Rasm Bel Kalimat (2014) |

Singles from Souwar
- 1. "Insa Alaalm"; 2. "Sit Alhilwat"; 3. "Tehebbeni"

Souwar (Pictures) is the nineteenth album by Kathem Al Saher, released on 30 September 2008. Kathem El Saher anticipated album has finally been released. The album is entitled “Souwar” (Pictures) and includes 13 songs that remarks an innovation and overlap in the music and the lyrical content.

In this album Kathem wrote and composed five songs, meanwhile he returned singing poems from the great poet archive Nizar Qabbani, added also to an Iraqi Folklore song.

Finally, Kathem recently shot the album's first music video in Australia under the direction of Rachel Abdullah and currently Rotana started airing the video.

== Track listing ==
| No. | Title | Writer(s) | Length |
|---|---|---|---|
| 1. | "Sit Alhilwat" | Kadim Al Sahir | 3:38 |
| 2. | "Insa Alaalm" | Kadim Al Sahir | 3:46 |
| 3. | "Akhiran" | Dawood Ghannam | 4:12 |
| 4. | "Alamk" | Dawood Ghannam | 4:18 |
| 5. | "Tehebb Teddallaa" | Kadim Al Sahir | 3:48 |
| 6. | "Omm Alshaila" | Kadim Al Sahir | 3:45 |
| 7. | "Makhed Alrouh" | Kadim al-Saadi | 5:16 |
| 8. | "Souwar" | Badr bin Abdul Mohsen | 4:15 |
| 9. | "Sadaf" | Kadim Al Sahir | 3:55 |
| 10. | "Tehebbeni" | Badr bin Abdul Mohsen | 4:16 |
| 11. | "Hat Hudnak" | Dr. Nashwa Jarrar | 4:44 |
| 12. | "Aayel" | Kadim al-Saadi | 4:17 |
| 13. | "Maa Bagdadyi" | Nizar Qabbani | 7:32 |
