= Lara Holzmüller =

German athlete

Lara Holzmüller (born 2000) is a German athlete who has represented Germany in judo and field hockey at international competitions for athletes with intellectual disabilities. She has competed at the Special Olympics World Games and at European and world championships in ID judo.

== Career ==
Holzmüller competed at the 2017 World Championships in G-Judo (now referred to as ID judo) held in Cologne, where she won a bronze medal in her weight category.

In 2019, she participated in the 2019 Special Olympics World Summer Games in Abu Dhabi, where she won a silver medal in judo. Her medal performance was also referenced in coverage of subsequent competitions.

Later in 2019, she won a silver medal at the ID judo European Championships in Cologne in the -70 kg category.

In addition to judo, Holzmüller competes in field hockey. She was part of the German team at the 2023 Special Olympics World Games in Berlin. Her participation was also noted in connection with Bavarian state sports recognition in 2023.

International coverage of ID judo competitions has also referenced Holzmüller among medalists at major championships.

== See also ==
- Intellectual disability
- Judo
- Field hockey
