= O Houria =

O Houria اوه حرية

Studio album by Souad Massi
- Released: 2010
- Label: Wrasse

Souad Massi chronology
Mesk Elil (2005)	O Houria اوه حرية (2010)	El Mutakallimun (2015)

O Houria (اوه حرية "Oh Liberty") is the 2010 fourth album of Souad Massi.

== Track listing ==
1. Samira Meskina
2. All Remains To Be Done -duet with Francis Cabrel
3. Kin Kohun Alik Ebaida
4. Ô Houria (Liberty)
5. Nacera
6. A Letter To... Si H'med
7. Everything I Love
8. Khabar Kana
9. Enta Ouzahrek
10. Stop Pissing Me Off
11. A Smile
12. Let Me Be In Peace, feat. Paul Weller
