= Sri Lanka at the 2019 Special Olympics World Summer Games =

- Flag of Sri Lanka
- IOC code: SRI
- NOC: Special Olympics Serendib
- Website: Special Olympics Serendib

in Abu Dhabi, United Arab Emirates 14 – 21 March
- Competitors: 20 in 5 sports
- Medals Ranked 136th: Gold 2 Silver 3 Bronze 0 Total 5

Serendib competed at the 2019 Special Olympics World Summer Games in Abu Dhabi, United Arab Emirates from 14 to 21 March 2019. This was Sri Lanka's third participation at the Special Olympics World Summer Games since making its debut in 2011.

20 athletes competed at the multi-sporting event in 5 different sports. Serendib clinched 5 medals at the event including 2 gold medals and 3 silver medals.

== Participants ==
Sport	Men	Women	Total
Athletics	2	1	3
Badminton	2	0	2
Bocce	0	1	1
Football	0	8	8
Swimming	3	3	6

== Medallists ==
Medal	Name	Sport	Event
Gold	Sajith Weligamage	Athletics	Men's long jump M03
Gold	Shahika Hettiarachchi	Swimming	Men's 25m freestyle
Silver	Dumindu Perera	Athletics	Men's 100m
Silver	Kavinda Rathuwaduge; Vinoth Mudalige	Badminton	Men's unified sports doubles
Silver	Arun Prashanth	Swimming	Men's 50m freestyle
