= Deb (album) =

Studio album by Souad Massi
- Released: 2003
- Label: Wrasse

Souad Massi chronology
Raoui (2001)	Deb (2003)	Mesk Elil (2005)

Deb (داب ) is the 2003 second album of Souad Massi.

== Track listing ==
1. Ya Kelbi
2. Ghir Enta (غير انت)
3. Ech Edani
4. Yemma
5. Yawlidi (يا ولدي)
6. Le Bien Et Le Mal
7. Houria
8. Deb (داب)
9. Moudja
10. Passe Le Temps
11. Theghri
12. Beb El Madhi
