= Shabaz (band) =

- Origin: San Francisco, California
- Genres: Qawwali, dhrupad
- Years active: 1994–present
- Labels: City of Tribes, Mondo Melodia
- Members: Sukhawat Ali Khan, Riffat Sultana, Richard Michos

Shabaz is a world-dance musical trio based in the Bay Area of San Francisco, California. Its name refers to Lal Shahbaz Qalandar, a Sufi saint who is a major inspiration behind the musical genre of qawwali. Its members are brother-and-sister Pakistani vocalists Sukhawat Ali Khan and Riffat Salamat, as well as Bay Area multi-instrumentalist/producer Richard Michos. It was established in 1994 as the Ali Khan Band; its members decided to change its name to Shabaz in 2001 to avoid confusion with other "Ali Khan"s. Both Khan and Salamat are descended from Chand and Suraj Khan, who sang to Akbar the Great when he was emperor of the Mughal Empire.

As the Ali Khan Band, the band released two albums on the San Francisco-based City of Tribes label. They signed with Mondo Melodia in 2001, and released their self-titled album as Shabaz on September 11, 2001.

== Critical reception ==
Derk Richardson described Shabaz as an atypically successful attempt at combining world and dance music, writing that the band had "succeeded where countless others have faltered." He further stated that there were two reasons the album was successful at achieving this crossover, namely: "The Khans sacrifice none of the emotional power of their singing in Shabaz's aggressively pop-crossover format, and Michos carefully complements their ecstatic stylings with his deftly programmed arrangements of traditional Asian and Middle Eastern acoustic instruments and modern Western electric guitars and synthesizers." Robert Christgau gave the album a 3-star honorable mention, describing the band as "sister and brother qawwali singers with more spirit than shame and an American collaborator helping them take their bhangra and chela technopop". Silke Tudor wrote that on the album, "synthesizers and keyboards accent the ecstatic vocalizations of Sukhawat and Riffat, which is the opposite orientation of most exports from the Asian Underground."

== Discography ==
- Shabaz (Mondo Melodia, 2001)
