= Mondo Melodia =

Mondo Melodia was a world music-oriented imprint of Ark 21 Records, owned by Miles Copeland III. The imprint's vice president was Dawn Elder, who left the label in 2002. It released numerous albums by multiple well-known Middle Eastern musicians. In addition to studio albums by individual musicians, the label also released multiple collections of songs by multiple artists; the most notable of these was 2002's Bellydance Superstars, which was the label's fastest selling album as of the following September. Another of the label's compilations, Mondo Platinum (2002), sold millions of copies.

== Notable artists ==
Artists who released one or more album on the imprint included:

- Rachid Taha
- Andy
- Hakim
- Shabaz
