= Mesk Elil =

Studio album by Souad Massi
- Released: November 1, 2005
- Label: AZ Records (Universal Music Group)

Souad Massi chronology
Deb (2003)	Mesk Elil (2005)	O Houria (2010)

Mesk Elil (مسك الليل night-blooming jasmine) is the third album of Souad Massi, the Algerian-born, Paris-based singer-songwriter, following her 2004 album Deb. The album peaked only at #56 on the French albums chart, but remained on the chart for almost ten months, and won Victoires de la Musique World music album of the year. Mauritanian vocalist fr:Daby Touré, fr:Pascal Danaë, a French-born musician of Caribbean ancestry and Mino Cinelu on percussion are a few of the artists appearing on the recording.

== Track listings ==
1. Mesk Elil
2. Kilyoum
3. Ilham
4. Khalouni
5. Denia Wezmen
6. Tell Me Why
7. Miwawa
8. Dar Djedi
9. Malou
10. Hagda wela kter

The French release booklet, 9837339, contains French translations only, but no Arabic sung texts.
