= Ila Tilmitha =

Album by Kadim Al Sahir

Studio album by Kathem Al Saher
- Released: November 11, 2004
- Recorded: Cairo, Dubai, Beirut
- Genre: Arabic Pop, Classical Arabic
- Length: N/A
- Label: Rotana

Kathem Al Saher chronology
Hafiat Al-Kadamain (2003)	Ila Tilmitha (2004)	Entaha al Mushwar (2005)

Ila Tilmitha is the sixteenth album by Kathem Al Saher, released on November 11, 2004. The album contains collaborations with Asmaa Lemnawar.

== Track listing ==
#	Title
1	"Ahibini Bil A'qed"
2	"Furshat Ramel Al Baher"
3	"Ila Tilmitha"
4	"Sayegheen El Zahab"
5	"Amshi Bi Hadawa"
6	"Sayedat O'mri"
7	"Kaberee A'qlek"
8	"Ghurfat El Makiaj" - Mawal
9	"May Wared"
10	"Aih Ye'ni"
11	"Wala Dinia"
12	"Ishsar Ishdawa"
13	"Ashko Ayam" - with Asmaa Lemnawar
