= Hafiat Al-Kadamain =

Studio album by Kadim Al Sahir
- Released: June 29, 2003
- Recorded: Cairo, Dubai, Beirut
- Genre: Arabic Pop, Classical Arabic
- Length: N/A
- Label: Rotana

Kadim Al Sahir chronology
Qusat Habebain (2002)	Hafiat Al-Kadamain (2003)	Ila Tilmitha (2004)

Hafiat Al-Kadamain is the sixteenth album by Kadim Al Sahir, released on June 29, 2003. The album contains the international successful single "The War Is Over", featuring Sarah Brightman.

== Track listing ==
#	Title
1	"Kul Ma Tekbar Tehla"
2	"Sabahak Sukar"
3	"Al Helwa"
4	"Hal Endak Shak"
5	"Darb Al Alam"
6	"Aboos Rohak"
7	"Al Azizain"
8	"Tegulin Al Hawa"
9	"Meneen Enta"
10	"Hewar Ma'a Al Nafs"
11	"Menu Ent"
12	"The War Is Over"
