= Assala =

Syrian singer and television personality (born 1969)

- أصالة
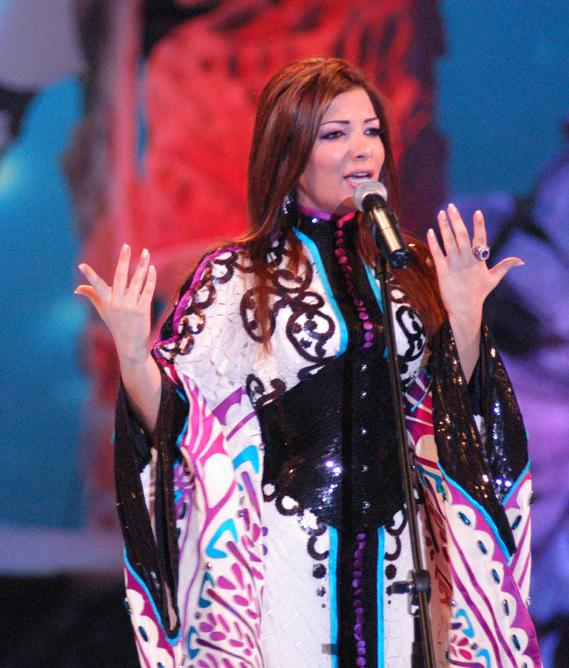
- Assala in 2006
- Born: Aṣṣala Moṣṭafa Ḥatem Naṣri; 15 May 1969 (age 57); Damascus, Syria
- Occupations: Singer; Television personality
- Years active: 1983–present
- Spouses: Ayman Al Dahabi (div. 2005) Tarek Alarian (m. 2006; div. 2020) Faeq Hassan (m. 2021)
- Children: 4
- Musical career
- Genres: Arabic, Arabic pop, Arabesque, Middle Eastern Kürtçe
- Instrument: Vocals
- Labels: Rotana, Farasan, EMI, Stargate Music Production

Assala Mostafa Hatem Nasri (Note: Arabic: أصالة مصطفى حاتم نصري) (born 15 May 1969), mononymously known as Assala (Note: Arabic: أصالة), is a Syrian singer and television personality. Referred to as the "Megastar", she is widely regarded as one of the most iconic and powerful voices in the Arab world.

Born in Damascus, Syria, into a musical family, Assala was the daughter of Mustafa Nasri, a renowned Syrian singer and composer who played a significant role in nurturing her musical talents from a young age. By the age of four, she had begun performing on children's programs and singing patriotic songs, gaining early recognition in Syria. She also performed religious and children's songs and sang the theme song Qessas Al Sho'oub for the cartoon series Hekayat Alamiyah. Assala's commercial musical career began in 1991 with the hit Egyptian song Law Ta'rafou (1993). The album featured four Egyptian songs in the oriental operatic tarab style and became an instant hit in Egypt, featuring songs such as Ya Sabra Yana (1990) and Samehtak Ketir (1993).

Assala publicly supported the Syrian revolution and opposed Bashar al-Assad. She later left Syria, going into exile and settling in Cairo, Egypt with her family while continuing to perform in various Arab countries. In addition to her singing career, Assala hosted a television program called Soula on Al Hayat TV and Dubai TV. In 2014, she was selected as a peace ambassador for the Middle East by the organization MasterPeace in connection with an event marking International Day of Peace. In 2019, she performed Right Where I'm Supposed to Be, the official song of the Special Olympics World Summer Games.

Following the fall of the Assad regime in December 2024, Assala released Syria Janna (2024). In September 2026, she returned to Damascus with her family and performed at Al-Fayhaa Sports Hall, marking her first concert in Syria in 15 years and her first official performance in the country since February 2010, when she appeared at the Damascus Opera House.

== Early life ==
Assala Mostafa Hatem Nasri was born on 15 May 1969 in Damascus, Syria, into a musical family. Her father, Mustafa Nasri, was a renowned Syrian singer and composer who played a significant role in nurturing her musical talents from a young age. By the age of four, Assala had begun performing on children's programs and singing patriotic songs, gaining early recognition in Syria. She also performed religious and children's songs and sang the theme song "Qessas Al Sho'oub" (قصص الشعوب) for the cartoon series Hekayat Alamiyah (حكايات عالمية). In 1986, her father died after suffering internal bleeding caused by a car accident. At the age of 17, Assala helped her mother care for her siblings Reem, Amani, Ayman, and Ayham.

== Career ==
Assala Nasri performs at the opening ceremony of the 2011 Arab Games on 9 December 2011

Assala's commercial musical career debuted in 1991 with the hit Egyptian song Law Ta'rafou (Egyptian Arabic: لو تعرفو). The album had 4 Egyptian songs in the oriental operatic Classic Egyptian tarab style. The album was an instant hit in Egypt back at that time with heartbreaking songs like Ya Sabra Yana and Samehtak Ketir. She quickly cemented her presence in the Arabic world a growing industry brimming with singers like Angham, Najwa Karam and Latifa. Throughout the 1990s, Assala released several successful albums, including Ya Sabra Yana (1993), Ala Aini (1996), and Mohtama Bel Tafasil (1999).

Some of Assala’s awards includes Murex d’Or for Best Female Arabic Singer, Cairo International Festival Award for the second song of 1996 (Arab American Artist), Best Voice at various regional music festivals, Best Female Singer Award for the year 2005-2006 and Award Almyoriks role as the best Arab singer of 2007.

In 2019, Assala performed Right Where I'm Supposed to Be as the Official Song of the 2019 Special Olympics World Summer Games in Abu Dhabi, United Arab Emirates in collaboration with Ryan Tedder, Avril Lavigne, Luis Fonsi, Hussain Al Jassmi and Tamer Hosny. In 2020, Assala's album La Testaslem achieved significant streaming success, becoming the most-streamed album in Saudi Arabia and ranking third in the Middle East and North Africa on Deezer. She was also the platform's fifth most-streamed Arab singer in the region and was among the 50 most-streamed Arab artists on Anghami.

== Opposition to the Assad Regime and Assala's Exile ==
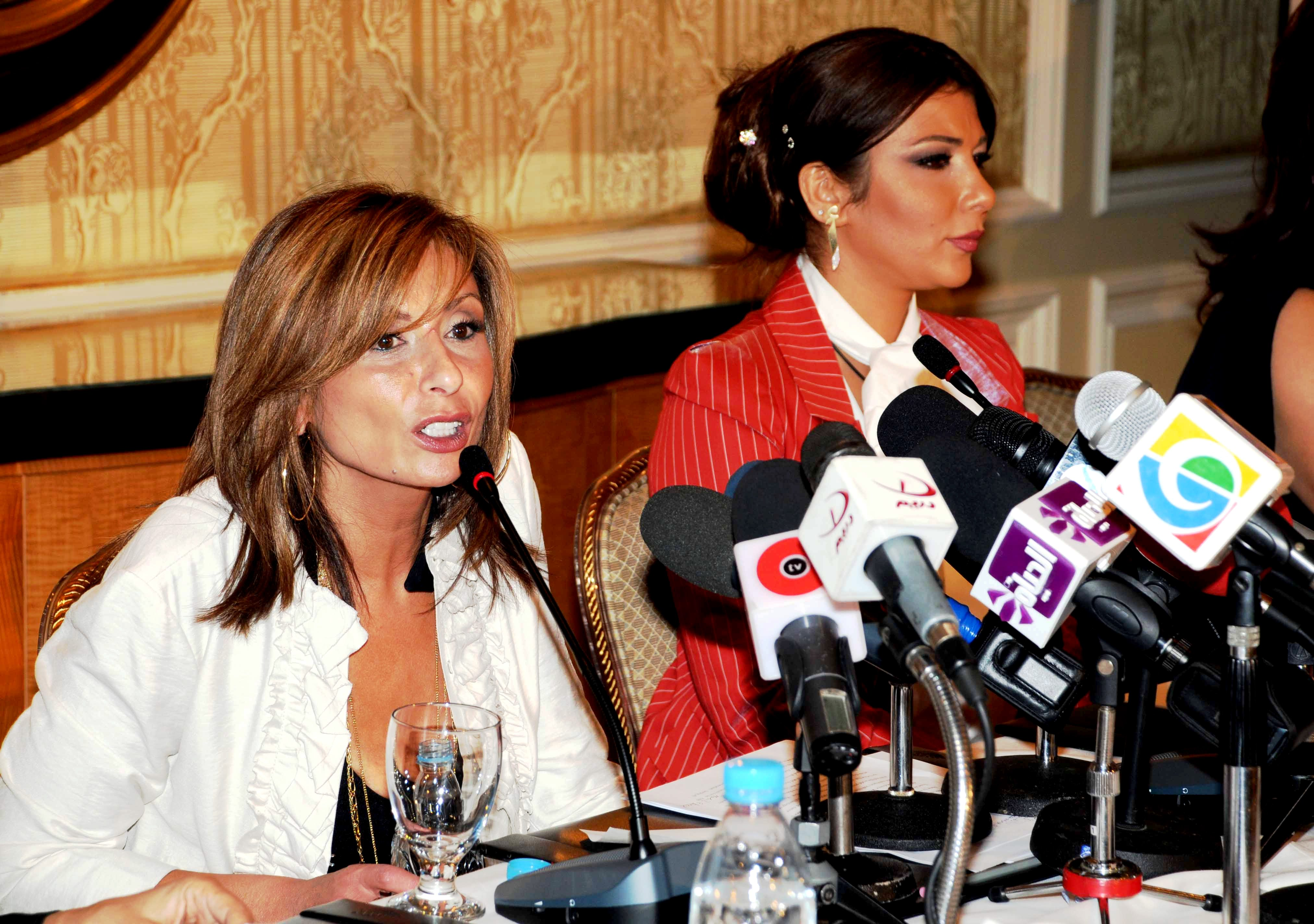
Assala Nasri at a press conference in Egypt with Dawn Elder in 2009

During the Syrian civil war, Assala Nasri expressed support for the Syrian people and opposition to Bashar al-Assad. In December 2011, she said that Syria belonged to its people rather than Assad, declared her support for the Syrian revolution, and opposed artists participating in events supporting the Syrian government. In 2012, she released the song Ah Law Hal Korsy Byehki ("If This Chair Could Speak") in support of the Syrian protesters.

In 2014, she was selected as a peace ambassador in the Middle East by the organization MasterPeace in connection with an event marking International Peace Day. Assala's position was criticized by Syrian actress Raghda, who argued in 2011 that the government of former president Hafez al-Assad had treated Assala for polio.

Assala later left Syria. She was removed from the Syrian Artists Syndicate and went into exile, settling in Cairo, Egypt with her family and performing in various Arab countries. Assala was arrested on 26 June 2017, at Beirut International Airport at the behest of Lebanese officials who supported Bashar al-Assad, reportedly for the perceived crime of fraternizing with Israel. She had recently performed in Palestine. She was placed under house arrest but was quickly released for lack of evidence. However, some pro-Assad outlets never corrected their claims that she had been arrested for carrying drugs.

=== Post-Assad Syria ===
Following the fall of the Assad regime in 2024, Assala released Syria Janna ("Syria Is Heaven") in December 2024, calling for unity and reconstruction.

Assala arrived in Damascus with her family on 15 September 2026, and performed her concert at Al-Fayhaa Sports Hall in Damascus on 17 September, her first concert there after 15 years in exile and her first official performance in Syria since February 2010, when she appeared at the Damascus Opera House.

The concert was sponsored by the Ministry of Culture and the Syrian Artists Syndicate as part of Summer of Syria 2026. The concert was held under heavy security following a campaign by some religious conservatives calling for its cancellation. Syrian Islamist cleric Abdul Razzaq al-Mahdi called it a "concert of music and debauchery", while a group of preachers in Damascus urged Syrian Culture Minister Mohammed Yassin Saleh to consider "the religious identity of society". Assala did not directly respond to the criticism but said during the concert that "recovery will only happen with art and music".

During her concert, Assala said, "I could not believe that I am among you," describing her return to Syria as a dream she had held for many years. At the beginning of the concert, she explained that she did not feel far from home during her years in Egypt, adding, "I do not want to say that I was absent for 15 years, as I was not abroad; I was in Egypt, which is also a homeland." During the two-hour concert, led by maestro Adnan Fathallah and directed by Lebanese director Bassem Christo, Assala performed songs from her earlier repertoire and recent releases, opening the concert with the song Syria Janna, whose refrain includes Erfa' Rasak Fok ("Raise Your Head High"), before presenting selections from her new Syrian Album, a 14-song project inspired by the musical traditions and cultural heritage of Syria’s governorates.

== Television ==
Assala hosted a television program called Soula (Arabic: صولا), on Al Hayat TV and Dubai TV. The show presented guest musicians as though they were visiting Assala in her home in Cairo, Egypt.

Assala was also a judge on the panel of Saudi Idol on its debut in 2022, along with Aseel Abu Bakr, Ahlam, and Majid Al Mohandis.

== Personal life ==
Assala's first marriage was to Syrian producer Ayman Al-Dahabi in 1991. Their daughter, Sham, was born in 1992, followed by their son, Khaled, in 1998. The couple divorced in 2005 after approximately 15 years of marriage.

In March 2006, Assala married Palestinian-Egyptian director and producer Tarek Alarian. They had twin sons, Adam and Ali, in 2011. The couple divorced in January 2020, with Assala announcing their separation on Instagram on 6 January.

In September 2021, Assala married Iraqi poet and director Faeq Hassan, who was the business manager of Iraqi singer Majid Al Mohandis. Assala confirmed the marriage through her official Instagram account.

In November 2026, Assala revealed that jewelry, including sentimental gifts and family keepsakes, worth a reported $6 million had been stolen after her 31 October concert in Detroit, Michigan.

== Style ==
Assala is recognized for her versatility as a vocalist, performing operatic ballads, classical Arabic music, and contemporary pop with a high level of proficiency. Her singing is distinguished by its clarity, strength, and emotional expression. Her repertoire frequently explores complex emotions, including intense love and personal hardship, which she conveys with a sincere and expressive delivery.

Her combination of contemporary musical styles with elements of traditional Arabic music has enabled her to appeal to audiences across different generations. While older listeners value her incorporation of classical traditions, younger audiences are attracted to her modern arrangements and relatable lyrics.

Assala’s ability to perform in a range of Arabic dialects, including Egyptian, Gulf, and Levantine Arabic, has further expanded her appeal and helped her establish a broad audience throughout the Arab world.

== Discography ==
=== Studio albums ===
- Ya Sabra Yana (Patient Me) (1990)
- Assala Performs Umm Kulthum (1990)
- O'zorni (Forgive Me) (1991)
- Ghayar Awi (He's So Jealous) (1991)
- Taw'am Al Rouh (My Soul's Twin) (1992)
- Ighdab (Be Angry) (1993)
- Wala Tessadda' (Don't Believe It) (1994)
- Rahal (He Left) (1995)
- Erja' Laha (Return to Her) (1996)
- Al Mushtaka (The Complaint) (1997)
- Alby Bayrtahlak (My Heart Is Comfortable For You) (1998)
- Ya Magnon (O Madman) (1999)
- Yakhy Esaal (Ask About Me) (2000)
- Moshtaah (I'm Missing You) (2001)
- Yamin Allah/Haqiqat Waqe'i (I Swear/My Reality) (2002)
- Ad El Horouf (As Much as the Number of Letters) (2003)
- Awgat (Sometimes) (2004)
- Ady (Ordinary) (2005)
- Hayati (My Life) (2006)
- Sawaha Qalbi (My Heart Has Done It) (2007)
- Nos Hala (Half State) (2008)
- Qanon Kaifak (Law of Your Fancy) (2010)
- Shakhseya Aneeda (A Stubborn Personality) (2012)
- 60 De'ee'a Hayah (60 Minutes of Life) (2015)
- Alleg El Deneia (I Hang the World) (2016)
- Mohatamma Bel Tafasil (Interested in the Details) (2017)
- Fi Orbak (Near You) (2019)
- La Testaslem (Don't Give Up) (2020)

Refkan

- Shayfa Feek (See You) (2022)
- Lehekt Nafsi (I Followed Myself) (2023)
- Thumma Ana (Then I) (2024)
- Daribet El Bo3d (Cost of Separation) (2025)

=== Singles ===
- "Law Ta'rafou" (If You Know) from Law Ta'rafou
- "Ighdab" (Get Angry) from Ighdab
- "Al Mushtaka" (The Complainer) from Al Mushtaka
- "Alf Leila We Leila" (One Thousand and One Nights) from Al Mushtaka
- "Ya Magnoun" (O Madman) from Ya Magnoun
- "Ma Oultelish" (Why Didn't You Tell Me?) from Ya Magnoun
- "Moushta'a" (I'm Missing You) from Moushta'a
- "E'tef Habibi" (Have Mercy My Love) from Moushta'a
- "Mab'ash Ana" (I Haven't Lived Up to My Name if I Don't) from Moushta'a
- "Leih El Ghorour" (Why the Arrogance?) from Ya Akhi Es'al
- "Yamin Allah" (I Swear) from Yamin Allah/Waqe'i
- "Misheit Senin" (I Walked for Years) from Ad El Horouf
- "Tassawar" (Imagine) from Ad El Horouf
- "A'taz Bek" (I Am Proud of You) from Ad El Horouf
- "Gemarhom Kellohom" (You Are the Moon Among Them) from Awgat
- "Meta Ashoufek" (When Will I See You?) from Awgat
- "Fein Habibi" (Where is My Love?) from Aadi
- "Khalik Shiwaya" (Stay) from Aadi
- "Asfa" (I'm Sorry) from Aadi
- "Aktar" (More) from Hayati
- "Khaliha 'Ala Allah" (Leave It In God's Hands) [Ramadan Single]
- "Jarhi Fel Hawa" (My Injury in Love)
- "Allah Ya Omri Aleik" (You're Amazing)
- "Arod Leih" (Why Reply?) from Hayati
- "Bein Eideik" (In Your Hands) from Hayati
- "Alamtni" (You Taught Me) from Hayati
- "Hayati" (My Life) from Hayati
- "Egrab Gerrib" (Get Closer) from Sawaha Galbi
- "Sawaha Galbi" (My Heart Did It) from Sawaha Galbi
- "La Tekhaf" (Don't Be Afraid) from Sawaha Galbi (shot as a music video in 2009)
- "Wala Dary" (Doesn't Care)
- "Sum wa 'Asal" (Poison and Honey) 2010 Single
- "Ah law hal korsy Bye7ki" (If This Chair Would Talk) 2011 - this song is dedicated for the Syrian revolution against Bashar al-Assad. Assala composed this song. It's her first experience in composing.
- "Right Where I'm Supposed to Be" (Ryan Tedder with Avril Lavigne, Luis Fonsi, Hussain Al Jassmi, Assala Nasri and Tamer Hosny) - this was the official song of the Special Olympic World Games Abu Dhabi 2019.
- "Shakhseya Anida" (A Stubborn Personality) 2012
- "El Hakika" 2018
- "El Mustafa" 2018
- "Bent Akaber" 2019
- "Shamekh" 2020
- "Al Farq Al Kabir" 2020
- "La Tashkou Le Nas" 2022 EP
- "Tegoul Tebghani" 2022
- "Goraah" 2022
- "Ghalban" 2022
- "Shayfa Feek" 2022 EP
- "Bi El Salama" 2022
- "Zay El Mougezat" 2022
- "Manni Wafi" 2022
- "Elly Medayea Yefarea" 2022
- "Shayfa Feek" 2022
- "Sid Lghram" (feat. Asma Lamnawar) 2022
- "Ma Aaraftik" 2023

=== Charted songs ===
Title	Year	Peak chart position	Album
Title	Year	MENA	Album
"Ma Aaaraftik"	2023	13	Non-album single
