= Sukhawat Ali Khan =

Pakistani singer

- Born: 1960 (age 65–66); Pakistan
- Origin: Sham Chaurasia gharana
- Genres: Hindustani classical music, qawwali, world fusion, folk
- Occupations: Singer, harmonium player, music teacher
- Instruments: Vocals, harmonium
- Years active: 1967–present

Sukhawat Ali Khan (born 1960) is a Pakistani vocalist. The son of Salamat Ali Khan and nephew of Nazakat Ali Khan, he is a Hindustani classical music singer of the Sham Chaurasia gharana tradition, and folk music. He began singing and playing the harmonium at age seven and has performed around the world. He currently lives in the San Francisco Bay Area where he performs in the world-fusion ensemble Shabaz (formerly the Ali Khan Band) with his sister Riffat Salamat and her husband Richard Michos.

About his heritage and music, Sukhawat Ali Khan has said:

Each song I do has classical thought behind it and I know how to sing it properly, but my style comes from my life, too. I spent time in New York. I go to clubs. I like the hip hop beat, Latin music, rave. ... There's a performing energy there that I also feel. It's the same kind of energy a good Qawwali singer has, and we can really express it freely in America.

Sukhawat Ali currently leads two music ensembles in the San Francisco Bay Area: A Ghazal/Qawwali/Folk collective and a Sufi world fusion band. He is also actively involved in teaching Subcontinents Classical music.

== Discography ==
- Duur - 2024 (Single)
- Jogiya - 2023 (Single with Deepak Ram)
- Saaye - 2023 (Single)
- Paar Karo - 2022 (Single with Deepak Ram)
- Laaj - 2013 (with Deepak Ram )
- Taswir - 1998 (with the Ali Khan Band)
- Zindagi - 2000 (with the Ali Khan Band)
- Shabaz - 2001 (with Shabaz)
- Shukriya - 2007 (solo and with his Shukriya ensemble)
