= Shakhseya Aneeda =

Studio album by Assala Nasri
- Released: September 20, 2012
- Genre: World music
- Label: StarGate

Assala Nasri chronology
Qanon Kaifak (2010)	Shakhseya Aneeda (2012)	60 De'ee'a Hayah (2015)

Singles from Shakhsiya Aneeda
- 1. "Kabartak Ala Seedak" Released: Sep. 2012; 2. "Rouhi Wakhdani" Released: June 2013

Shakhseya Aneeda (Arabic: شخصية عنيدة) is the 23rd full-length studio album by a Syrian recording artist Assala Nasri, released on September 20, 2012. With this release, Assala explores for the first time a new set of sounds and genres including Dance, Latin, and house, by collaborations with some of the biggest names in the Arabic music industry including Tarek Madkour, Hadi Sharara, Hassan elShafei, Tamer Ali, and Hossam Habib.

== Track listing ==
International edition

No.	Title	Lyrics	Music	Producer	Length
1.	"Shaghel Bali Hawak" (Taking Over My Mind)	Abdel Hamed Habak	Hossam Habib	Hadi Sharara	4:10
2.	"Kabbartak Ala Seedak" (Too Comfortable With Your Master)	Mohammed Goma'a	Karim Mohsen	Ahmed Ibrahim	3:51
3.	"Oul Bahebbek" (Say "I Love You")	Gamal El Kholy	Tamer Ali	Hassan El Shafei	5:22
4.	"Ana Hobbek" (I'm Your Love)	Abdel Hamed Habak	Ehab Abdel Wahed	Nader Hamdy	4:18
5.	"Shakhseya Aneeda" (A Stubborn Personality)	Ahmed El Gendy	Madian	Ahmed Ibrahim	4:47
6.	"Asasi" (By The Way)	Ayman Bahgat Amar	Ahmed Salah	Tarek Madkour	3:31
7.	"Begad Tgannen" (Really Stunning)	Wael Tawfik	Madian	Wesam Abdel Hadi	4:23
8.	"Rouhy Wakhdani" (My Soul Took Me)	Wael Tawfik	Ahmed Mohi	Osama Abdel Hadi	5:09
9.	"Bona'an Ala Raghabatak" (Based on Your Requests)	Ahmed Ali Mosa	Tamer Ali	Nader Hamdy	4:41
10.	"Sabny" (He Left Me)	Abdel Hamed Habak	Ehab Abdel Wahed	Hassan elShafei	4:17
