= El Mutakallimun =

El Mutakallimun (Masters of the Word)

Studio album by Souad Massi
- Released: 21 April 2015
- Genre: International
- Length: 40:25
- Label: Wrasse

Souad Massi chronology
O Houria (2010)	El Mutakallimun (Masters of the Word) (2015)	Oumniya (2019)

El Mutakallimun (المتكلمون) is the sixth album of Souad Massi, the Algerian-born, Paris-based singer-songwriter, released in 2015. It is Massi's first album in classical Arabic. Poets range from Zuhayr bin Abī Sulmá the sixth century to Abu al-Qassim al-Shabbi in early twentieth century “To the Tyrants of the World.”

== Track listing ==
1. "Bima el Taaloul" – 3:59 / بم التعلل
2. "Lastou Adri" - 3:39 / لست أدري
3. "Ayna" - 3:42 / أبن
4. "Hadari" - 3:50 / حذاري
5. "Saimtou" - 4:48 / سئمتُ
6. "El Houriya" - 4:11 / الحرية
7. "Faya Layla" - 4:35 / فيا ليلى
8. "El Khaylou Wa El Laylou" - 3:47 / الخيل و البيداء
9. "El Boulbouli" - 4:17 / البلبل
10. "Saaiche" - 3:37 / سأعيش
