= 2019 Special Olympics World Summer Games =

Multi-sport event in Abu Dhabi, United Arab Emirates

15th Special Olympics World Summer Games الألعاب الصيفية العالمية الخامسة عشرة للأولمبياد الخاص
- Host city: Abu Dhabi, United Arab Emirates
- Motto: Meet the Determined (Arabic: تلبية العزم)
- Nations: 195
- Athletes: 7,500
- Events: 22 sports
- Opening: 14 March 2019
- Closing: 21 March 2019
- Opened by: Mohammed bin Zayed Al Nahyan
- Main venue: Zayed Sports City Stadium
- Website: Official website

Summer

Winter

The 2019 Special Olympics World Summer Games (Arabic: 2019 الألعاب الأولمبية الصيفية الخاصة بألعاب العالم الصيفية, 2019 al'aleab al'uwlimbiat alsayfiat alkhasat bi'aleab alealam alsayfia) were theh 15th summer Special Olympics, a multi-sport event for athletes with intellectual disabilities in the tradition of the Special Olympics movement. It was held in Abu Dhabi, United Arab Emirates, from March 14–21, 2019. ESPN offered international coverage of the Games.

The 2019 Special Olympics World Summer Games was the first Special Olympics event to take place in the Middle East, and were also the first to be held in spring in the host city, and the largest sports and humanitarian event recorded, featuring 200 National Programs, more than 7,000 athletes and 20,000 registered volunteers. Since 2017 and following its national policy, the United Arab Emirates coined the term "determination" instead of "disability", referring to disabled people as "People of Determination".

== Host selection ==
Three finalists were chosen from the countries which had submitted bids to host the Games: Australia, Germany (which was later chosen to host the 2023 Games), and South Africa. However, all three countries had withdrawn their bids by April 2015.

In November 2016, it was announced that the Emirate of Abu Dhabi would host the 2019 Summer Games. This was the first time that the Special Olympics were to be held in the Middle East / North Africa Region. Due to the region's extreme climate, the Games were held during the local late winter/early spring season for the first time, from March 14–21, 2019.

== Ceremonies ==
=== Opening ceremony ===
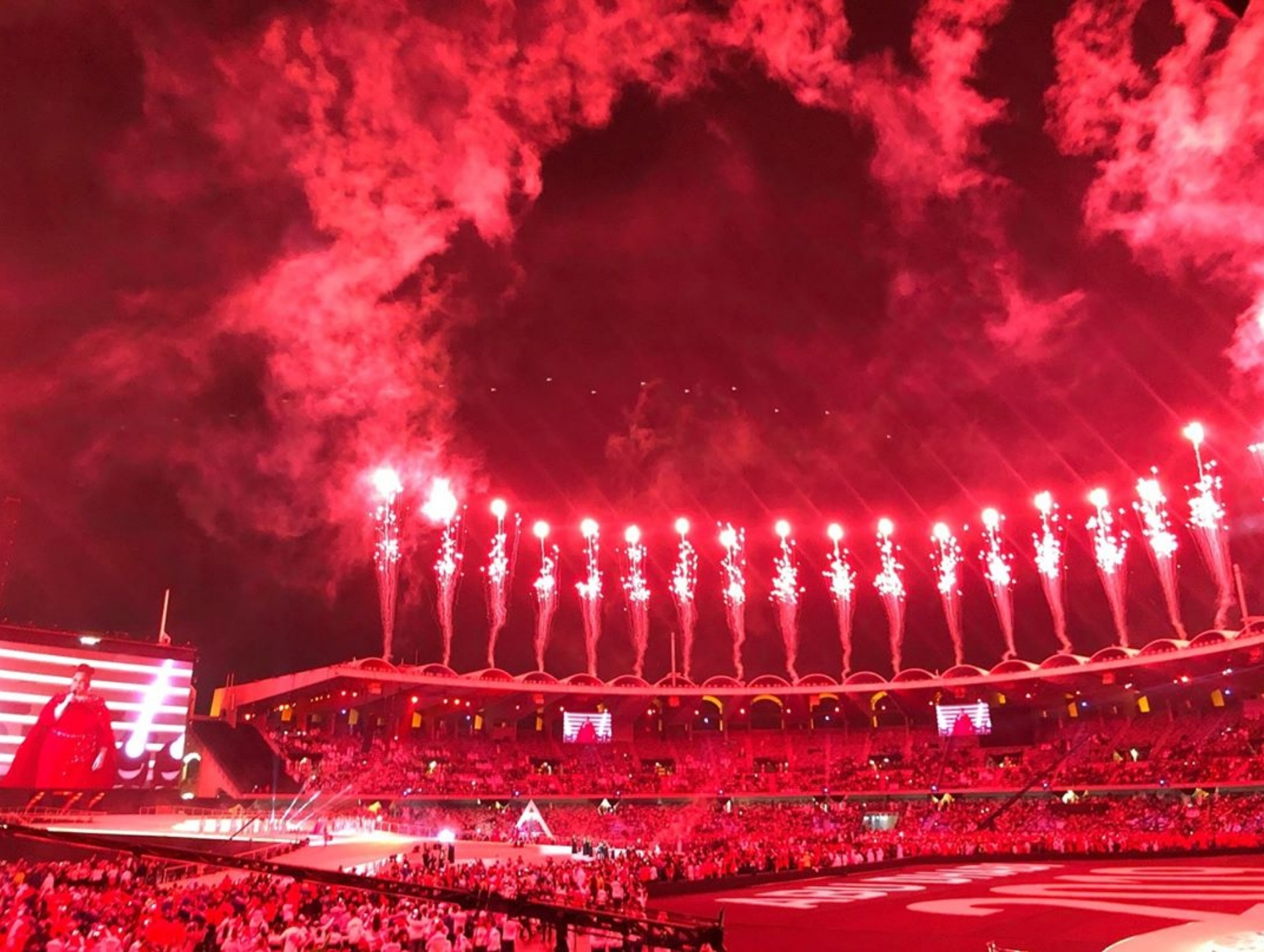
The closing ceremony of the 2019 Special Olympics World Summer Games in Abu Dhabi.

The closing ceremony took place on 14 March 2019 at the Zayed Sports City Stadium, which also held the FIFA Club World Cup in 2017 and 2018 and the 2019 AFC Asian Cup. The headliners of the ceremonies included Avril Lavigne, Hussain Al Jassmi, Assala Nasri, Tamer Hosny, Paul Oakenfold, Sumi Jo, Now United, and Luis Fonsi.

=== Closing ceremony ===
The closing ceremony took place on 21 March 2019 at the Zayed Sports City Stadium where the Special Olympics flag was handed over from Abu Dhabi to Jämtland County, Sweden as the hosts of the 2021 Special Olympics World Winter Games. The headliners of the ceremonies were Nicole Scherzinger, Keala Settle, Now United, Hamad Al Ameri, Rashed Al Majed and Waleed Al Shami. Before the ceremonies, the music video of the Games' theme song "Right Where I'm Supposed To Be" by Ryan Tedder, Avril Lavigne, Luis Fonsi, Hussain Al Jassmi, Assala Nasri and Tamer Hosny was premiered.

== Venues ==
Events were held at nine venues across two emirates:

=== Abu Dhabi ===
- Abu Dhabi National Exhibition Centre - badminton, basketball, bocce, gymnastics, handball, judo, powerlifting, roller skating, table tennis, volleyball
- Abu Dhabi Sailing and Yacht Club - kayaking, sailing
- Al Forsan Resort - equestrian
- Corniche - beach volleyball
- Yas Links Golf Club - golf
- Yas Marina Circuit - cycling, triathlon
- Zayed Sports City - ceremonies, bowling, football, tennis

=== Dubai ===
- Police Officers' Club Stadium - athletics
- Hamdan Sports Complex - swimming

== Sports ==
The following competitions took place:

2019 Special Olympics World Summer Games
- Athletics
- Badminton
- Basketball
- Beach volleyball
- Bocce
- Bowling
- Cycling
- Equestrian
- Football
- Golf
- Artistic gymnastics
- Rhythmic gymnastics
- Judo
- Handball
- Kayaking
- Open water swimming
- Powerlifting
- Roller skating
- Sailing
- Swimming
- Table tennis
- Tennis
- Volleyball

== Medals ==
=== Medal table ===
Unlike the Olympic and Paralympic Games, the Special Olympics do not provide an official medal table, since there is supposed to be no competitive pressure among the nations. Apart from the medals and placement ribbons, participants who were disqualified or did not finish their competition were also awarded with participation ribbons in order to promote sportsmanship.

==== Nations ====
* Host nation (United Arab Emirates)

Medals won by participating delegations
Rank	Nation	Gold	Silver	Bronze	Total
1	Canada	90	37	28	155
2	Russia	87	51	34	172
3	India	72	99	95	266
4	United States	72	61	70	203
5	United Arab Emirates*	64	54	63	181
6	Great Britain	63	57	49	169
7	China	58	60	39	157
8	Hong Kong	45	24	20	89
9	Australia	42	44	55	141
10	South Korea	42	26	28	96
11	Germany	41	43	28	112
12	Syria	36	44	24	104
13	Hungary	31	25	12	68
14	Netherlands	31	18	19	68
15	Ireland	30	29	27	86
16	Egypt	30	25	24	79
17	Poland	30	21	19	70
18	Greece	27	20	17	64
19	Belgium	24	21	22	67
20	Libya	24	21	15	60
21	Chinese Taipei	23	21	8	52
22	Bangladesh	22	9	6	37
23	Italy	21	41	45	107
24	South Africa	20	12	12	44
25	Pakistan	18	28	15	61
26	Trinidad and Tobago	18	15	23	56
27	Saudi Arabia	18	9	13	40
28	Cyprus	17	19	10	46
29	Romania	17	18	21	56
30	Puerto Rico	17	16	21	54
31	Uruguay	17	14	12	43
32	Spain	16	23	25	64
33	Costa Rica	16	13	23	52
34	France	16	12	15	43
35	Bahrain	16	12	11	39
36	Mexico	16	11	21	48
37	Lithuania	16	8	4	28
38	Sudan	16	7	4	27
39	Thailand	15	12	6	33
40	Japan	15	10	18	43
41	Panama	14	17	17	48
42	Macau	14	12	22	48
43	Iran	14	12	10	36
44	Uzbekistan	14	9	16	39
45	Jamaica	14	9	8	31
46	Finland	13	21	13	47
47	Austria	13	18	21	52
48	Sweden	13	14	4	31
49	Tunisia	13	10	11	34
50	Ivory Coast	13	4	13	30
51	Oman	12	19	17	48
52	Slovakia	12	17	6	35
53	Iraq	12	16	18	46
54	Switzerland	12	15	13	40
55	Morocco	12	13	22	47
56	Malta	12	13	15	40
57	Kazakhstan	12	11	11	34
58	Kenya	12	8	5	25
59	Colombia	11	20	10	41
60	Cayman Islands	11	6	8	25
61	Denmark	10	22	20	52
62	Paraguay	10	10	7	27
63	Czech Republic	10	7	4	21
64	Indonesia	10	6	4	20
65	Algeria	9	15	13	37
66	Estonia	9	14	6	29
67	Philippines	9	10	10	29
68	Nigeria	9	10	7	26
69	Venezuela	9	3	5	17
70	Iceland	8	14	12	34
71	Lebanon	8	11	9	28
72	Brazil	8	9	2	19
73	Norway	8	7	10	25
74	Gibraltar	8	7	3	18
75	San Marino	8	5	7	20
76	Saint Kitts and Nevis	8	2	3	13
77	Ecuador	7	14	11	32
78	Dominican Republic	7	14	9	30
79	Kuwait	7	8	7	22
80	Portugal	7	7	10	24
81	Jordan	6	13	14	33
82	Monaco	6	12	14	32
83	Azerbaijan	6	10	8	24
84	Peru	6	8	5	19
85	Suriname	6	6	3	15
86	Ukraine	6	5	3	14
87	Fiji	6	4	6	16
88	Argentina	6	4	4	14
89	Bahamas	6	3	5	14
89	Zimbabwe	6	3	5	14
91	New Zealand	5	13	14	32
92	Serbia	5	10	4	19
93	Palestine	5	6	13	24
94	Malaysia	5	6	3	14
95	Saint Vincent and the Grenadines	5	5	3	13
96	Timor-Leste	5	3	2	10
97	Nicaragua	5	2	4	11
98	Guinea-Bissau	5	0	0	5
99	Guatemala	4	8	11	23
100	Bulgaria	4	7	8	19
101	Israel	4	6	9	19
102	Mauritius	4	6	7	17
103	Senegal	4	6	3	13
104	Singapore	4	4	8	16
105	Luxembourg	4	4	7	15
106	Qatar	4	4	5	13
107	Montenegro	4	3	3	10
108	Latvia	4	3	1	8
109	Uganda	4	2	3	9
110	Turkmenistan	4	2	2	8
111	Tanzania	4	1	2	7
112	Slovenia	3	13	8	24
113	Burkina Faso	3	9	8	20
114	Croatia	3	7	0	10
115	Isle of Man	3	6	6	15
116	Cuba	3	5	3	11
117	Chile	3	3	7	13
118	Aruba	3	3	1	7
119	Dominica	3	3	0	6
120	Bosnia and Herzegovina	3	2	5	10
121	Tajikistan	3	2	2	7
122	North Macedonia	3	1	3	7
123	Barbados	3	1	0	4
124	Liberia	3	0	1	4
125	Mongolia	2	7	9	18
126	Liechtenstein	2	7	6	15
127	Andorra	2	7	3	12
128	Botswana	2	6	2	10
129	Bonaire	2	5	3	10
130	El Salvador	2	4	3	9
131	Rwanda	2	4	2	8
132	Samoa	2	4	1	7
133	Cambodia	2	3	4	9
133	Faroe Islands	2	3	4	9
135	Papua New Guinea	2	3	2	7
136	Benin	2	3	0	5
136	Malawi	2	3	0	5
136	Sri Lanka	2	3	0	5
139	Georgia	2	2	2	6
139	Guinea	2	2	2	6
141	Niger	2	2	1	5
142	Belarus	2	2	0	4
142	Cape Verde	2	2	0	4
142	Tonga	2	2	0	4
145	Saint Lucia	2	1	3	6
146	Yemen	2	1	2	5
147	Congo	2	1	1	4
148	Laos	2	1	0	3
149	South Sudan	2	0	3	5
150	Armenia	2	0	1	3
151	Kiribati	2	0	0	2
151	Kyrgyzstan	2	0	0	2
153	Honduras	1	6	6	13
154	Equatorial Guinea	1	4	1	6
155	Myanmar	1	3	2	6
156	Togo	1	3	1	5
157	Brunei	1	2	2	5
158	Afghanistan	1	2	1	4
158	Antigua and Barbuda	1	2	1	4
160	Zambia	1	2	0	3
161	Bolivia	1	1	6	8
162	American Samoa	1	1	3	5
163	Bhutan	1	1	1	3
163	Haiti	1	1	1	3
163	Mali	1	1	1	3
163	Moldova	1	1	1	3
163	Nauru	1	1	1	3
163	Nepal	1	1	1	3
169	Lesotho	1	1	0	2
169	Maldives	1	1	0	2
169	Seychelles	1	1	0	2
169	Solomon Islands	1	1	0	2
169	Vanuatu	1	1	0	2
174	Eswatini	1	0	2	3
174	Kosovo	1	0	2	3
176	Burundi	1	0	1	2
176	Namibia	1	0	1	2
178	DR Congo	1	0	0	1
178	Ghana	1	0	0	1
180	Bermuda	0	3	5	8
181	Guyana	0	3	2	5
182	Federated States of Micronesia	0	3	0	3
183	Comoros	0	2	0	2
184	Madagascar	0	1	2	3
185	Djibouti	0	1	1	2
185	Mauritania	0	1	1	2
185	Palau	0	1	1	2
185	Vietnam	0	1	1	2
189	Marshall Islands	0	1	0	1
190	Chad	0	0	2	2
190	Ethiopia	0	0	2	2
192	Gambia	0	0	1	1
192	Mozambique	0	0	1	1
192	Turkey	0	0	1	1
195	Albania	0	0	0	0
Totals (195 entries)		1,985	1,905	1,752	5,642

== Participating nations ==
Below is a list of all 195 participating delegations. The number of competitors per delegation is indicated in parentheses.

Delegations to the 2019 Special Olympics World Summer Games (according to the protocolar order)
- Greece (64) (Hellas)
- Democratic Republic of the Congo (3)
- Faroe Islands (12)
- Iceland (38)
- Liechtenstein (10)
- Macau (42)
- Moldova (11)
- Myanmar (9)
- Nepal (16)
- Norway (28)
- Sri Lanka (20) (Serendib)
- Sweden (53)
- Azerbaijan (54)
- Cyprus (35)
- Estonia (41)
- Kazakhstan (64)
- Luxembourg (36)
- Mongolia (28)
- South Africa (71)
- Tajikistan (5)
- Ghana (16)
- Uganda (32)
- Afghanistan (4)
- Albania (2)
- Czech Republic (44)
- Denmark (86)
- Georgia (4)
- Palestine (25)
- Portugal (34)
- Slovakia (42)
- Turkmenistan (15)
- Ukraine (20)
- Bahamas (24)
- Bahrain (24)
- Bangladesh (103)
- Benin (8)
- Bonaire (12)
- Botswana (32)
- China (105)
- Ivory Coast (81)
- Germany (164)
- Guyana (4)
- Haiti (16)
- Honduras (9)
- Iraq (79)
- Kiribati (2)
- Kuwait (52)
- Lebanon (45)
- Mali (12)
- Mauritius (13)
- Monaco (25)
- Pakistan (91)
- Saudi Arabia (46)
- Sudan (32)
- Switzerland (65)
- Trinidad and Tobago (30)
- Andorra (20)
- Aruba (21)
- Australia (106)
- Austria (77)
- Belgium (80)
- Bermuda (12)
- India (292) (Bharat)
- Brazil (36)
- Brunei (9)
- Cambodia (10)
- Canada (109)
- Chile (21)
- Cuba (8)
- Egypt (69)
- Fiji (21)
- Finland (70)
- Gibraltar (19)
- Great Britain (127)
- Hong Kong (72)
- Ireland (90)
- Italy (114)
- Jordan (26)
- Kenya (71)
- South Korea (106)
- Kyrgyzstan (4)
- Laos (5)
- Libya (36)
- Mauritania (5)
- Netherlands (67)
- Nigeria (60)
- Japan (74) (Nippon)
- Oman (92)
- Papua New Guinea (15)
- Poland (65)
- Rwanda (25)
- Samoa (17)
- San Marino (16)
- Slovenia (27)
- Spain (107)
- Suriname (13)
- Eswatini (4)
- Syria (95)
- Togo (4)
- Tunisia (32)
- United States (214)
- Uzbekistan (23)
- Vanuatu (4)
- Venezuela (12)
- Zambia (8)
- Zimbabwe (16)
- Algeria (69)
- American Samoa (12)
- Antigua and Barbuda (4)
- Argentina (12)
- Armenia (2)
- Barbados (4)
- Belarus (15)
- Bhutan (4)
- Bolivia (6)
- Bosnia and Herzegovina (18)
- Bulgaria (18)
- Burkina Faso (37)
- Burundi (4)
- Cape Verde (4)
- Cayman Islands (25)
- Chad (4)
- Chinese Taipei (50)
- Colombia (20)
- Comoros (4)
- Costa Rica (34)
- Croatia (12)
- Djibouti (3)
- Dominica (7)
- Dominican Republic (25)
- Ecuador (19)
- El Salvador (4)
- Equatorial Guinea (4)
- Ethiopia (4)
- France (84)
- Guatemala (25)
- Guinea (4)
- Guinea-Bissau (4)
- Hungary (62)
- Indonesia (68)
- Iran (33)
- Isle of Man (18)
- Israel (27)
- Jamaica (73)
- Kosovo (4)
- Latvia (14)
- Lesotho (4)
- Liberia (3)
- Lithuania (26)
- Madagascar (4)
- Malawi (3)
- Malaysia (29)
- Maldives (4)
- Malta (28)
- Marshall Islands (4)
- Mexico (32)
- Federated States of Micronesia (4)
- Montenegro (12)
- Morocco (40)
- Mozambique (4)
- Namibia (9)
- Nauru (4)
- New Zealand (43)
- Nicaragua (9)
- Niger (4)
- North Macedonia (18)
- Palau (3)
- Panama (40)
- Paraguay (20)
- Peru (22)
- Philippines (39)
- Puerto Rico (61)
- Qatar (17)
- Republic of the Congo (4)
- Romania (34)
- Russia (150)
- Senegal (27)
- Serbia (89)
- Seychelles (4)
- Singapore (30)
- Solomon Islands (3)
- South Sudan (4)
- Saint Kitts and Nevis (13)
- Saint Lucia (18)
- Saint Vincent and the Grenadines (24)
- Tanzania (15)
- Thailand (46)
- The Gambia (1)
- Timor-Leste (10)
- Tonga (4)
- Turkey (11)
- Uruguay (40)
- Vietnam (4)
- Yemen (4)
- United Arab Emirates (289) (Host)

== Marketing ==
=== Logo and branding ===
The logo was unveiled on March 25, 2017, during the handover at the closing ceremony of the 2017 Special Olympics World Winter Games in Graz, Austria. The logo was projected on the Burj Khalifa in Dubai. The logo was inspired by palm fronds woven together in an eastern Arabian cultural technique known in Gulf Arabic as khoos (Arabic: خوص), with the Special Olympics symbol in a red circle in the middle.

=== Corporate sponsorship ===
Sponsors of the 2019 Special Olympics World Summer Games
Presenting Partner
- Abu Dhabi National Oil Company
Official Partners
- Abu Dhabi Department of Energy
- ADNEC Group
- Aldar Properties
- Al Masaood LLC (Nissan)
- Coca-Cola
- Emaar Properties
- Etihad Airways
- Etisalat
- First Abu Dhabi Bank
- Mubadala Investment Company
Official Sponsors
- Emirates Transport
- LuLu Hypermarket
- Meydan
- Nirvana Travel & Tourism
- NMC Health
- Noon
- SoftBank Group
Official Suppliers
- Abu Dhabi Global Market
- Careem
- CreatorUp!
- Crescent Petroleum
- Daman
- EF Education First
- Ernst & Young
- Essilor
- GL events (Wicked)
- Golisano Foundation
- iWire
- KPMG
- Lions Clubs International
- Marriott International
- Perfect Sense
- Pierce Footwear
- Prometheus Medical
- Safilo
- SAS Institute
- Starkey Hearing Foundation
- Starkey Hearing Technologies
Official Supporters
- Al Sahraa
- CYVIZ
- Deloitte
- Dubai Airports Company
- Duracell
- Falcon Eye Drones
- Flow Solutions
- Hadef & Partners
- iSpatial Techno Solutions
- Kempinski (Emirates Palace Abu Dhabi)
- Khateb and Alami
- Liberty Sport
- Riedel Communications
- Salem Al Shueibi Jewellery
- SAP (Tyconz)
- SEDRA Foundation
- Seiko
- Smart Design
- SmartKiosk
- TMS
- twofour54
- Zayed Higher Organization for Humanitarian Care and Special Needs

Preceded by Los Angeles, Southern California, United States	Special Olympics World Summer Games	Succeeded by Berlin, Germany
