= Raoui =

Studio album by Souad Massi
- Released: 5 June 2001
- Recorded: 12–29 June 2000
- Studio: Studio Montmartre, Studios de la Seine, Christian Lachenal
- Genre: Algerian music
- Label: Wrasse
- Producer: Bob Coke

Souad Massi chronology
Raoui (2001)	Deb (2003)

Raoui (راوي "storyteller") is the first album of Souad Massi, the Algerian-born, Paris-based singer-songwriter, released by Wrasse Records in 2001. It was given a three-star rating by AllMusic reviewer Chris Nickson, who concluded: "there's plenty of promise for the future, as long as she really remembers her roots and doesn't wander the empty halls of rock." The Arabic lyrics and translations are published.

== Track listing ==
1. "Raoui" - 3:47
2. "Bladi" - 3:41
3. "Amessa" - 3:47
4. "Tant Pis Pour Moi" - 3:07
5. "Hayati" - 4:10
6. "Nekreh El Kelb" - 4:36
7. "Denya" - 3:23
8. "Khsara Aalik" - 4:45
9. "Rani Rayha" - 4:49
10. "J'ai pas de temps" - 4:06
11. "Awham" - 4:25
12. "Lamen" - 4:51
13. "Enta Dari" - 3:46
14. "Matebkiche" - 3:29

== Sales ==
Region	Certification	Certified units/sales
United Kingdom	—	10,000
