= Kadim Al Sahir =

Iraqi singer and composer (born 1957)

Kadim Al Sahir كاظم الساهر
- Al Sahir in 2018

Background information
- Born: Kadim Jabbar Ibrahim Al Samarrai كاظم جبار إبراهيم السامرائي; 12 September 1957 (age 69); Mosul, Kingdom of Iraq
- Genres: Classical crossover, Arab pop, operatic pop, folk pop, world
- Occupations: Singer, composer, songwriter
- Years active: 1980–present
- Labels: Al Nazaer Media Group, Stallions Records, Relax-In, Rotana Music Group, Platinum Records

Kadim Jabbar Ibrahim Al Samarrai (Arabic: كاظم جبار إبراهيم السامرائي; born 12 September 1957), better known by his stage name Kadim Al Sahir (كاظم الساهر), is an Iraqi singer and composer. Dubbed "The Caesar", he has earned numerous local, regional, and international awards. One of the most famous singers in the Arab world, Al-Sahir has sold more than 100 million albums and written more than 40 hit songs, including "Ana Wa Layla" (Me and Layla), "Salamtak Men Al Ah" (Get Well Soon) and "La Titnahad" (Don't Sigh).

By 1988, he gained popularity in many Arab countries with compositions such as "Ladghat El-Hayya" and "Abart El-Shat". His musical career was hindered by the outbreak of the Gulf War in 1990. After leaving Iraq, his songs and titles championed the Iraqi people while they lived under Saddam Hussein's rule and Western sanctions. In 2011, he was named a goodwill ambassador by UNICEF.

Al-Sahir has performed a wide range of Arabic music from pop to classical and singing in most Arabic dialects. His music is known for fusing traditional Arabic melodies with diverse international music forms. He has collaborated with international stars such as Quincy Jones, Sarah Brightman, Lenny Kravitz, and had frequent partnerships with the revered Syrian poet Nizar Qabbani. His romantic poetry in music has established him as a cultural icon.

He appeared as a judge in the television show The Voice: Ahla Sawt from 2012 to 2015, alongside Assi El Hallani, Sherine, and Saber Rebai. In 2020, he appeared on the frontpage of Vogue Man Arabia.

== Early life and education ==
Al Sahir was born in Mosul, Iraq on September 12, 1957, to a Sunni father and a Shia mother from Najaf. His father lived in Baghdad but was a Samarra native from the tribe of Darraj. Kadhem Al Sahir grew up and spent a large part of his life in Al-Hurrya neighborhood in Baghdad. Growing up in a low-income household in Mosul, he saw his mother struggle to raise eight children.

Apart from his mother, Al Sahir's family were never supportive of his direction in becoming a musician. They had no faith in him that he would become successful, and instead wanted him to become a doctor or a lawyer. Al Sahir's brother once took him to different places where people usually sang, and told him it was his choice to sing in a respectful way, or he could choose to do it the bad way. He said that the only way to achieve success is for one to respect his music and respect himself.

In 1980, Al-Sahir started teaching music. Two years later, he pursued studies at the Institute of Music of Baghdad.

== Professional career ==
=== 1987–1996: Formative period ===
Although Al-Sahir generally steers clear of political themes, his 1987 song "Ladghat al-Hayaa" (“The Snake Bite”)—aired on Iraqi television a year before the Iran–Iraq War ended—sparked controversy because its lyrics were interpreted as a critique of the conflict. Broadcast officials demanded that he alter the lyrics or face the song being banned. In 1996, Al Saher met and formed a songwriting partnership with Syrian poet Nizar Qabbani, who wrote the lyrics to his music.

Nizar Qabbani, who previously wrote lyrics for superstars of the 1960s and 1970s like Abdel Halim Hafez and Najat Al Saghira, wrote the lyrics to more than 30 of Al Sahir's songs, including “Zidini Ashqan” (“Love Me More”), “Hal Endak Shak” (“Do You Have a Doubt”), and “Ahibini Bella Ukad” (“Love Me With No Constraints”), among many others. In addition to Qabbani's poems, Al Sahir sang both political and romantic songs for Iraq and Baghdad, highlighting the feelings of the citizens of Iraq as well as their tragedies. In 1995, Al Sahir travelled to Northern England to film the music video for his notable sentimental ballad “Ha Habibi” ("Hey, My Beloved") in the Sunny Bank and Coniston Water area of the Lake District.

In November 1996, Al Sahir traveled to Germany to film his music video for “Zidini Ashqan” in freezing conditions at locations including Schloss Landsberg in Ratingen, as well as Leverkusen and Burscheid. The music video was directed by Jordanian filmmaker Hussein Daibis, with assistance from Lebanese director Saeed Al-Marouk and a German crew, and produced by the Arab Radio and Television Network (ART).

=== 1998–2003: Breakthrough ===
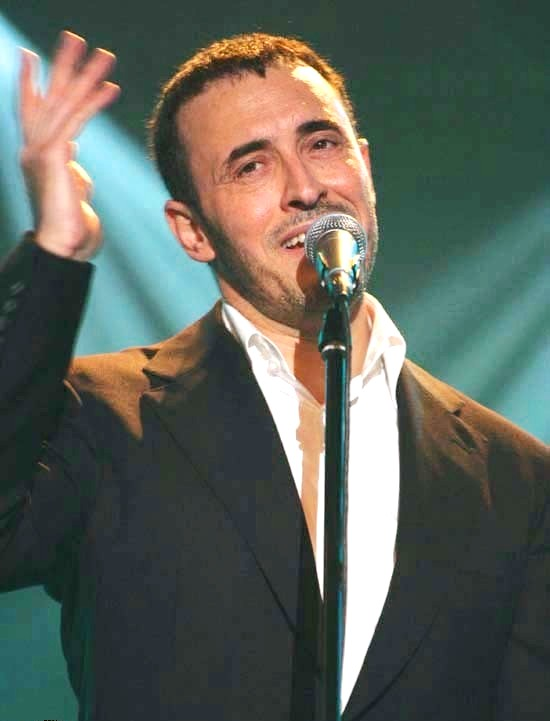
Al-Sahir performing at an event in 2007

Al Sahir continued to release albums and tour, having become a big name in Middle Eastern music. His ballads grew bigger and more romantic, but he would also write classically influenced works, even when they might hurt his popularity. In 1998, Al Sahir filmed "Quli Ohiboka" ("Tell Me You Love Me") at the Spanish Steps and Castello di Tor Crescenza in Rome, Italy.

By 1998, he had ten albums under his belt and was lauded as an artist, not just a pop star. That prestige brought him wider fame and a growing international reputation that won him a UNICEF award for his song "Tathakkar", which he performed in the U.S. for Congress and the United Nations–one of the first real post-Gulf War cultural exchanges. The following year, he recorded a tribute to the Pope with the Italian Symphony Orchestra. Releasing numerous albums and touring extensively in this era, Al Sahir became both a high-grossing superstar and a respected musical artist. In 1999, Kadim Al Sahir's music video for "Akrahouha" ("I Hate Her") was filmed in Venice, Italy, featuring Al Sahir singing along the city's iconic canals.

In 2000, Al Sahir traveled to Los Angeles to film the music video for ‘La Titnahad’ (‘Don’t Sigh’) at a storefront on Beverly Boulevard, at the corner of North Martel Avenue in the Fairfax District. Following the U.S. invasion of Iraq in 2003, Al Sahir's music changed to reflect new regional and global attention to Iraq during wartime. As scholar Christopher Phillips writes in Everyday Arab Identity (2012):

"Although Iraqi singers were not historically that well known due to their isolation from the wider Arab world during Saddam Hussein’s rule, Kathem al-Saher made a name for himself after 2003, singing in classical Arabic, often about the destruction of Iraq under occupation and war. His success might indicate a certain level of Arab solidarity, with viewers opting to show their support for Iraq through the purchase of songs depicting its misfortune."

=== 2004–2010: Collaborations ===
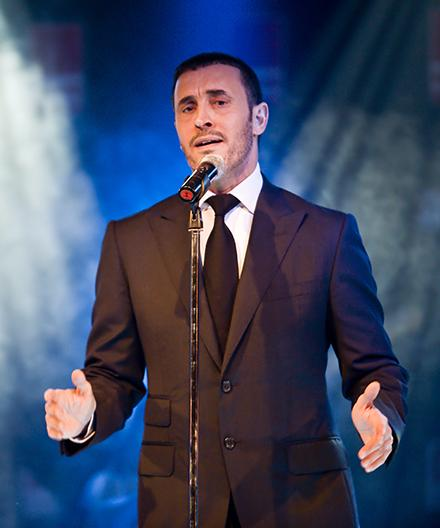
Al Sahir performing in 2009

In 2004, Al Sahir collaborated with Lenny Kravitz and released an anti-war song at Rock The Vote, titled "We Want Peace", and shortly afterward released a song entitled "The War Is Over" (Entahat al harab) with Sarah Brightman, which was released on her album Harem and his album Hafiat Al-Kadamain. Both of these international duets were executive produced by Dergham Owainati, of EMI Music Arabia, for Kadim's part.

In 2004, Al Sahir continued to work with various international artists including Grammy Award-winning producers KC Porter, and Quincy Jones. His collaboration "Love & Compassion" (Hob Wa Haneen) was the title track for the Arab American National Museum Collector's edition honoring the artists that have made the most significant difference with international audiences. The track features Grammy winning singer/songwriter Paula Cole, Def Jam recording artist Karina Pasian, and Luis Conte and was produced by KC Porter and Dawn Elder.

In 2004, he participated in the worldwide broadcast concert special "We are the Future" produced by Quincy Jones and coordinated by Dawn Elder at the Roman Maximos Stadium in Rome for the benefit of the children of the world. In December 2004, he participated in the opening of the Gulf Football Championship (Khaleeji 17) in which he performed the return of Iraq Operette which was broadcast live on 10 satellite channels. Additionally, in 2004, he was the first Arab artist to participate in Unity, the official album of the 2004 Summer Olympics.

Releasing his album Ila Tilmitha on November 11, 2004. The album contains collaborations with the Moroccan Asma Lamnawar whom Kadim Al Sahir discovered earlier and introduced to the Arab world in her first due song with Kadim "ashko ayaman". The album also included the song "Ahbeni," written by poet Nizar Qabbani, shot as a video clip by Husien Duibes; it became a major hit in the year 2004 alongside the song "Ila Tilmitha." In a late 2000s interview, Al Sahir commented on melodic similarities between Beyoncé's 2008 single "Single Ladies (Put a Ring on It)" and his 1992 song "Hatha El Loun" (هذا اللون), suggesting that the former borrowed from his composition.

=== 2011–present: Humanitarian initiatives ===
UNICEF named Al Sahir as the new Goodwill Ambassador for Iraq for the year 2011. For Al Sahir, this was a compelling reason to visit his country after 14 years. He sang Bokra ("Tomorrow"), a charity single that was released on November 11, 2011, at 11:11 pm, along with Rim Banna, Akon, Tamer Hosni, Diana Karazon, Marwan Khoury, Latifa, Souad Massi, Hani Mitwassi, Saber El Robai, Wa'ed, Sherine, and other Arab artists. The single distributed the proceeds of its donations to various organisations, especially institutions and charities with arts and culture programs. The eight-minute song was written by Majida Al-Roumi and was produced by Quincy Jones and RedOne.

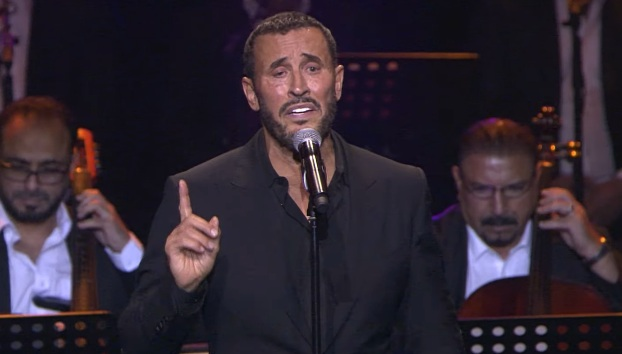
Kadim Al Sahir performing in Abha, Saudi Arabia, in August 2019

In 2016, he debuted as a coach for MBC The Voice Kids, and his team member Lynn Hayek from Lebanon was the winning contestant in the Season 1 Finale held on March 5. After his concert in the Saudi city of Al-Taif in July 2018, several pro-government Saudi commentators speculated that Qatar might revoke his citizenship due to the ongoing blockade imposed on the gas-rich emirate by Saudi Arabia and its allies. In the months following the blockade's start in June 2017, Al-Sahir was reported to have performed at a private event in Qatar. This led some Saudis to speculate that his planned concerts in Saudi Arabia would be cancelled—but they proceeded as scheduled.

In collaboration with an Abu Dhabi cultural foundation, he performed solo in his first virtual hybrid concert in 2020 due to the pandemic. Al Sahir emphasized his commitment to innovation, stating he will not perform without introducing new material. This aligns with his legacy as a pioneer of Arabic music, blending classical and modern styles.

In November 2023, Al-Saher released the sentimental ballad, "Hold Your Fire" in collaboration with the United Nations. Composed by Al-Saher, the song was part of a humanitarian initiative promoting peace and raising awareness of humanitarian efforts. The war song was performed in English to reach an international audience, with proceeds designated to support the United Nations' humanitarian activities. Al-Saher stated that he intended the song to draw attention to the rising number of civilian deaths in the Gaza Strip during the Gaza war. He described the song as “a heartfelt cry for peace and a testament to the resilience of the human spirit.” In November 2026, Al-Saher is scheduled to perform three concerts at the Sydney Event Centre at The Star in Pyrmont, Sydney, Australia. The concerts will feature an orchestra and performances of his notable hits.

== Personal life ==
Al Sahir left Iraq in the early 1990s after the Gulf War, and moved to Lebanon, before resettling in Cairo. Al Sahir did not have a permanent residence and frequently moved, mainly between Cairo, Dubai, Toronto, Beirut, and Paris. In a 2003 interview with Sayidaty, Al-Saher stated that he was engaged to a woman of Spanish-Lebanese descent, with whom he planned to settle in Paris. He declared that he continued to divide his time between Canada, France, Egypt and Lebanon, although he was considering settling permanently in one country.

In February 2019, Kadim officially asked to change his last name from Al Samarai to Al Sahir. Al Sahir has both Qatari and Canadian citizenship. Despite living abroad, Al-Saher maintained a strong attachment to Iraq, which he described as his spiritual home. He articulated his commitment to representing Iraq through his songs and his intention to return once peace and security were restored.

As of 2022, Al Sahir settled with his family in Rabat, Morocco. He has two sons, Wisam and Omar Al Sahir, both of them married. Kadim is also a grandfather to Wisam's daughter Sana. Al Sahir has remained unmarried since his divorce from his first wife, whom he married at 19.

== Discography ==
=== Albums ===
- شجرة الزيتون (The Olive Tree) (1984)
- غزال (Ghazal) (Gazelle) (1989) Music Box International
- العزيز (Al Aziz) (The Beloved) (1990) Al-Nazaer Media Group
- هذا اللون (Hatha Alloun) (This Color) (1992) Stallions Records
- لا يا صديقي (La Ya Sadiki) (No, My Friend) (1993) Music Master
- (Banat Alaebak) (Your Tricks are Over) (1993) Stallions Records
- (Salamtak Min El) Ah (Your Safety From Hardships) (1994) Rotana Records
- بعد الحب (Baad ElHob) (After Love) (1995) [Relax-In Records]
- اغسلي بالبرد (Eghsely Belbarad) (Wash In The Cold) (1996) Rotana Records
- في مدرسة الحب (Fi Madrasat Al Hob) (In the School of Love) (November 23, 1996) Rotana Records
- انا و ليلى (Ana Wa Laila) (Laila and I) (November 28, 1997) Rotana Records
- حبيبتي والمطر (Habibati Wal Matar) (My Love & The Rain) (January 1, 1999) Rotana Records
- الحب المستحيل (Al Hob Al Mustaheel) (The Impossible Love) (July 27, 2000) Rotana Records
- أبحث عنكِ (Abhathu Anki) (Looking For You) (September 28, 2001) Rotana Records
- قصة حبيبين (Qussat Habebain) (A Story of Two Lovers) (January 1, 2002) Rotana Records
- حافية القدمين (Hafiat Al Kadamain) (Barefooted) (June 29, 2003) Rotana Records
- الى تلميذة (Ila Tilmitha) (To a [Female] Student) (November 11, 2004) Rotana Records
- انتهى المشوار (Entaha Almeshwar) (The Journey Is Over) (November 1, 2005) Rotana Records
- يوميات رجل مهزوم (Yawmyat Rajoul Mahzoom) (Diary of a Defeated Man) (March 29, 2007) Rotana Records
- صور (Sowar) (Pictures) (September 29, 2008) Rotana Records
- الرسم بالكلمات (Al Rassem Bil Kalimat) (Drawing with Words) (October 12, 2009) Rotana Records
- (Latizidih Lawa'a) (Don't Add Anguish to Him) (January 2, 2011) Rotana Records
- كتاب الحب (Kitab Al Hob) (The Book of Love) (September 20, 2016) Platinum Records
- مع الحب (Ma'ah Al Hob) (With Love) (February 14, 2024) Kadim Al Sahir
- بلا عنوان (Bila' Enwan) (Untitled) (August 27, 2026) Kadim Al Sahir

== International concerts ==
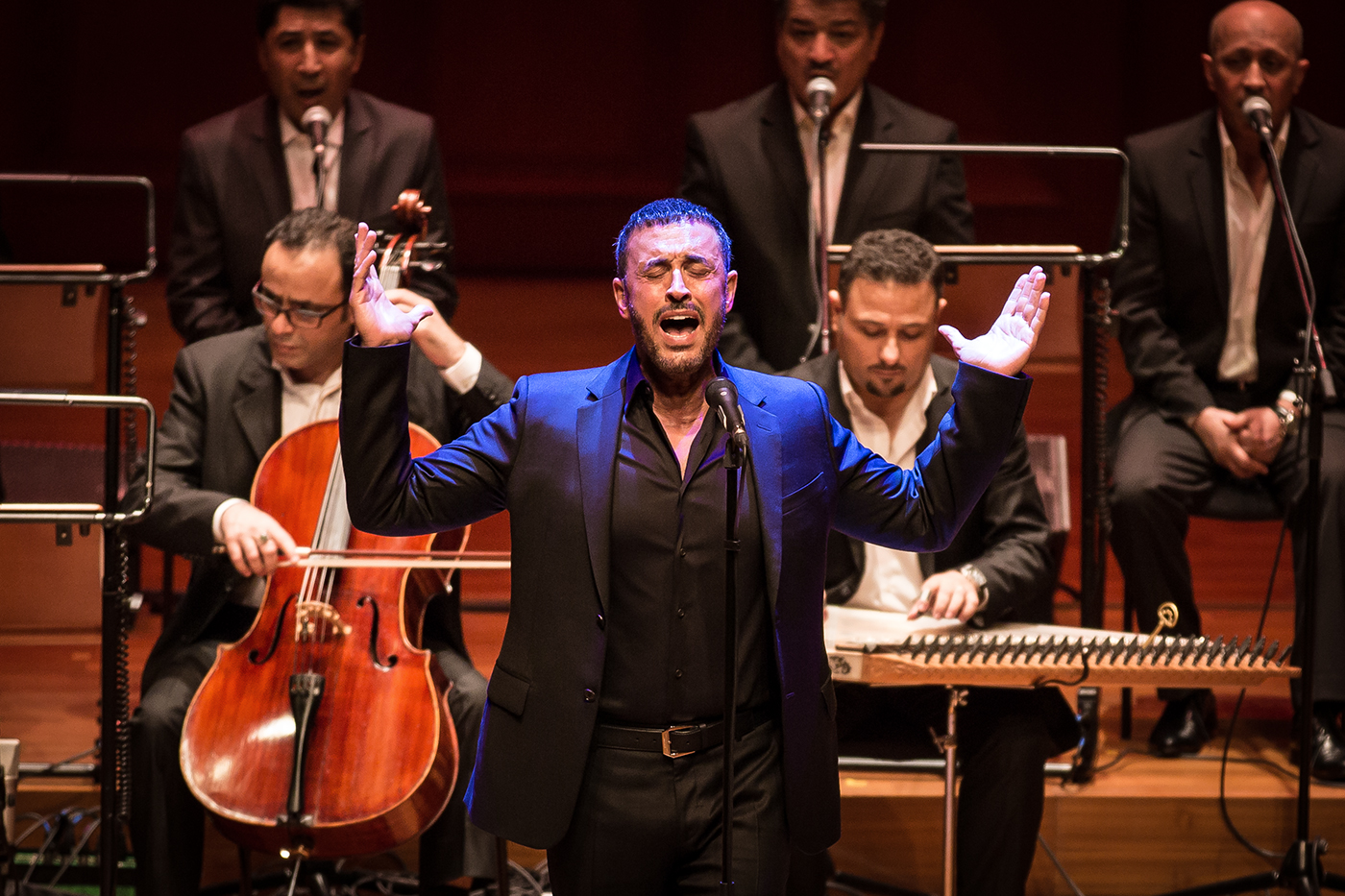
Al-Sahir performing at the Royal Opera House Muscat in Oman in 2016.

Kadim Al Sahir tours around the world performing for his mostly Arab fans. He has performed in many countries, including the USA, Canada, France, Germany, Italy, Australia, and England. Major venues include:

- Royal Albert Hall in 1997, 2004, and 2006
- Sydney Opera House, 2002 and 2022
- Sydney Olympic Park, 2016
- Beacon Theatre in New York, 2003
- The Circus Maximus in Rome where Kadim was a part of "Live from Rome's Circus Maximus" (May 16, 2004). Participants in this concert included other artists such as Carlos Santana, Alicia Keys, Norah Jones and Andrea Bocelli. Famous international producer Quincy Jones warmly introduced Kadim Al Sahir to Rome's concert attendees whose number exceeded 500,000.
- Hammersmith Apollo in January 2019 (Middle East Eye)
