= Emirates Transport =

Tradename for Emirates Public Transport and Services Company PJSC

- Founded: 1981
- Headquarters: Dubai, UAE
- Area served: UAE
- Key people: Mohammed Abdullah Al Jarman, general manager; Abdullah Al Ghufli, executive director of School Transport; Waleed Salim Al Mehairi, executive director of Transport & Rentals Division; Amer Al Harmoudi, executive director of Technical Services Division; Humaid Mohammed Al Qatami, Chairman; Hassan Ahmed Al Ubaidali, director of public school transport; Abdullah Mohammed Al Kindi, executive director of Business Development Division
- Services: Public transport, logistics, rentals
- Revenue: Dh1.8 billion (2014)
- Total assets: Dh2 billion (2013)
- Website: Official website

Emirates Transport (ET) is the tradename for Emirates Public Transport and Services Company PJSC, the UAE's government-owned public transport provider, particularly for the government and education sectors. Created in 1981, it now counts with over 35 thousand vehicles on its fleet and more than 26 thousand employees. It transports 250 thousand children to school on a daily basis.

== History ==
Emirates Transport was established pursuant to Federal Law No. 17 of 1981 in order to perform public school transportation. It now provides an array of services at 41 locations country-wide, including hired car services, car, motorcycle and van rentals, logistics, auto maintenance, roadside assistance, as well as vehicle fuel conversion services (petrol to CNG). Its organisational structure is composed of 4 operational sectors: School Transport; Transport & Rental; Auto services; Logistics. Since 2013, jurisdiction over ET was transferred to the Emirates Investment Authority.

In 2013, ET partnered with the Saudi Public Transport Company, based in Riyadh, to enter the Saudi school transport market on an equal ownership basis. Its revenues for that same year amounted to Dh1.5 billion, with an annual growth rate of 18% over the preceding 5 years. Its total assets were stated at Dh2 billion in the same report.

In March, 2015, Emirated Transport signed a Memorandum of Understanding with French transport group Keolis, to bid for future business renders within the UAE public transport sector in a conjunt manner. Together, they plan on bidding for the passenger phase of Etihad Rail.

=== Locations ===
Emirates Transport operates the UAE, and possesses a network of 27 business centers and units and 7 subsidiaries, offering 38 services at 41 locations throughout the country. The latter include 9 main branches in Abu Dhabi, Al Ain, Al Gharbia, Dubai, Sharjah, Ajman, Ras Al Khaimah.

== Clients ==
- Ministry of Education
- Emirates airports
- Emirates Flight Catering
- Jebel Ali Airport
- Transguard
- Federal Authority for Land and Maritime Transport
- NTA
- ADCO
- UAE private schools
- Emirates National Oil Company
- Etihad Rail
- DP World
- Keolis
- Shurooq
- Abu Dhabi Education Council
- Emirates Post

== Recognition ==
In 2010, it entered the Guinness World Records title for the largest parade of Hyundai buses in the world, and again in 2013, for performing the largest first aid lesson in the world, at the Abu Dhabi branch.

In 2014, ET ranked 11th best company to work for by the Great Place to Work Institute in the Dubai Chronicle ranking. In 2015 it was named 9th among the 2015 Asia's Best Workplaces, by the same institute.

It received the ISO 39001 certification by the BSI in 2012, and in 2013, it received a Special Recognition Award of the Emirates Energy Award for "the use of clean transportation fuels". ET also received the Mohammed bin Rashid Government Excellence Award as part of the Sheikh Khalifa Government Excellence Program and the Grow with Public Transport award for the MENA Region from the International Association of Public Transport.
