= Souad Massi =

Souad Massi سعاد ماسي
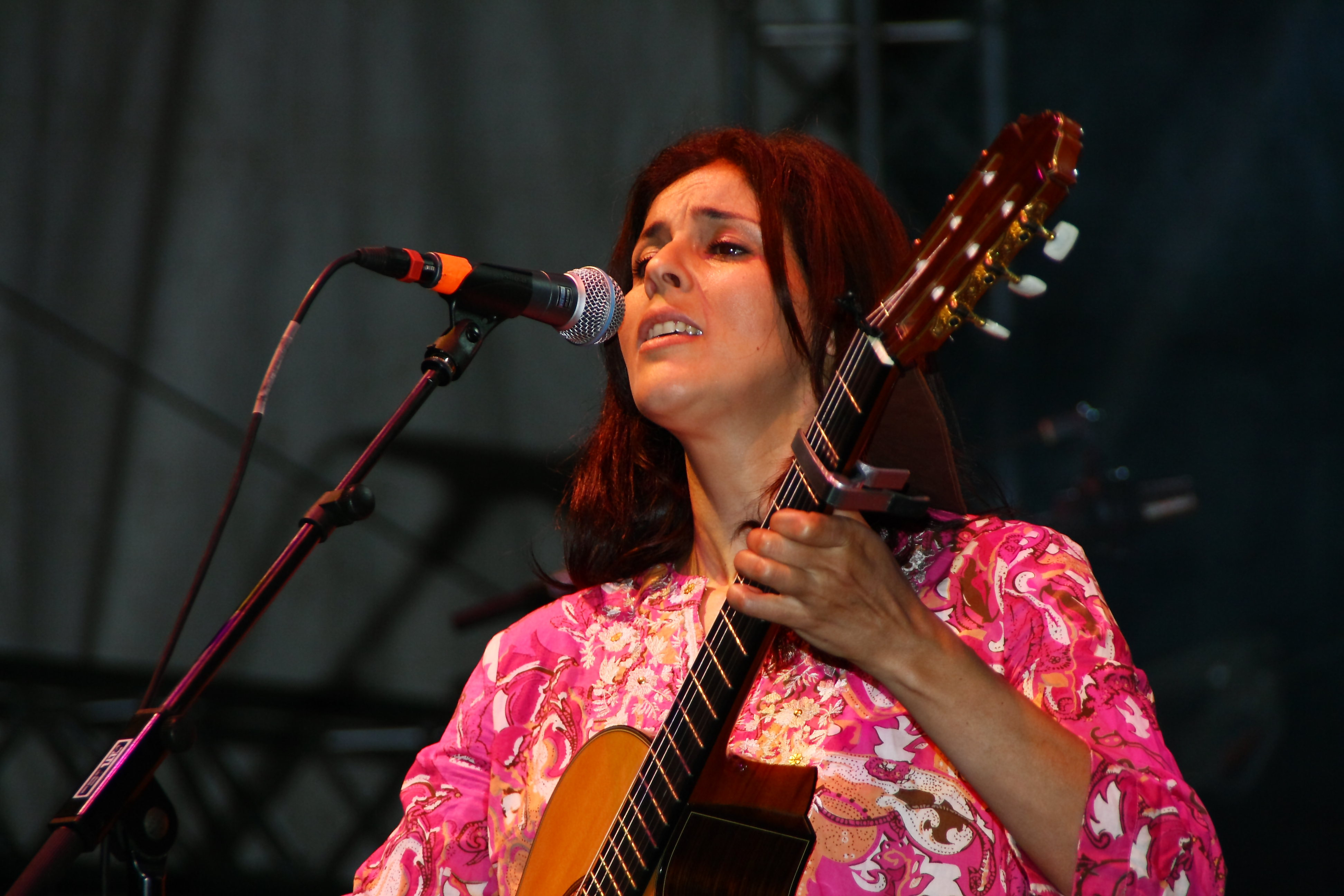
- Souad Massi at TFF Rudolstadt 2013.

Background information
- Born: August 23, 1972 (age 53); Algiers, Algeria
- Genres: Rock, Country, Fado, Algerian folk music, World music
- Occupations: Musician, songwriter
- Instruments: Vocals, Guitar
- Years active: 1999–present
- Labels: Island, Naïve Records,

Souad Massi (Arabic: سعاد ماسي; born August 23, 1972) is an Algerian Berber singer, songwriter and guitarist. She began her career performing in the Kabyle political rock band Atakor, before leaving the country following a series of death threats. In 1999, Massi performed at the Femmes d'Algérie concert in Paris, which led to a recording contract with Island Records.

Massi's music, which prominently features the acoustic guitar, displays Western musical style influences such as rock, country or the Portuguese fado but sometimes incorporates oriental musical influences and oriental instruments like the oud as well as African musical stylings. Massi sings in Classical Arabic, Algerian Arabic, Egyptian Arabic, French, occasionally in English, and in the Kabyle Berber language, often employing more than one language in the same song.

== Childhood and early bands ==
Souad Massi was born in Algiers, Algeria to a poor family of six children. She grew up in the working-class Bab El Oued neighborhood of Algiers and took up singing and playing the guitar at an early age.

Encouraged by her older brother, she began studying music at a young age, singing and playing guitar. Growing up, she immersed herself in American country and roots music – musical styles that would later strongly influence her songwriting. At the age of 17, she joined a flamenco band, but quickly grew bored and left.

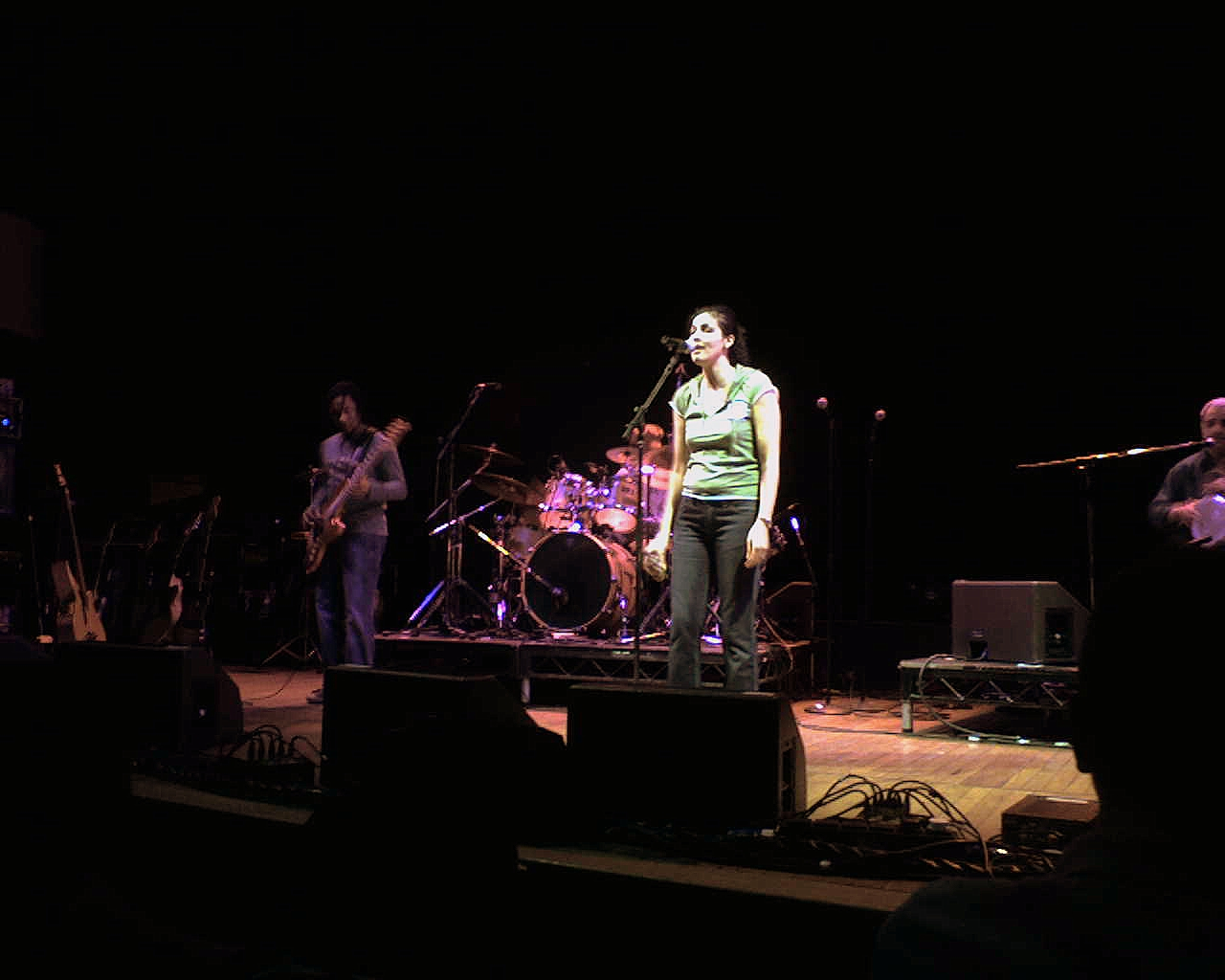
Massi performing in 2005

In the early 1990s, Massi joined the Algerian political rock band Atakor, who were influenced by Western rock bands such as Led Zeppelin and U2. She recorded and performed with the group for seven years, releasing a successful album and two popular music videos. The band, however, with its political lyrics and growing popularity, became a target. Massi disguised herself by cutting her hair and dressing in male clothing, but she nevertheless became the target of a series of anonymous death threats from Islamist conservatives in the country. In 1999, she left the band and moved to Paris, France.

== Personal life ==
Massi currently lives in Paris, France with her two daughters Inji and Amira. She is a fan of Leonard Cohen and has listed the music from AC/DC and INXS as having been among her formative influences.

== Solo career ==
In 1999, Massi was invited to perform at the Femmes d'Algérie ("Women of Algeria") festival in Paris, which led to a recording contract with Island Records. In June 2001, she released her solo debut album, Raoui ("Storyteller"), which Allmusic compared to 1960s American folk music. Sung mostly in French and Arabic, the album became a critical and commercial success in France. The following year, she was nominated for "Best Newcomer" at the Radio 3 World Music Awards.

In 2003, she released her second album, Deb ("Heartbroken"). The album's lyrics were more personal, rather than political, and it became one of the most successful North African albums worldwide. Three years later, Massi released her third album, Mesk Elil ("Honeysuckle"). The album expanded on the themes of love and loss that had been explored on Deb, and featured duets with Daby Toure and Rabah Khalfa. She was the Italian variety show's guest star "Non facciamoci prendere dal panico" in 2006 by Italian singer and showman Gianni Morandi.

In 2010, she released her fourth studio album Ô Houria. This album was produced by Francis Cabrel and Francoise Michel. It features Paul Weller on piano and vocals on its closing song. In 2023, her album Sequana was distinguished with the German Record Critics' Award.

== Discography ==
=== Solo albums ===
- 2001: Raoui
- 2003: Deb
- 2005: Mesk Elil
- 2007: Live acoustique
- 2010: Ô Houria
- 2015: El Mutakallimun
- 2019: Oumniya
- 2022: Sequana
- 2026: Zagate

Preceded by First	Victoires de la Musique; World music album of the year Mesk Elil by Souad Massi; 2006	Succeeded by Canta by Agnès Jaoui; 2007
