= Cross-country skiing at the 2010 Winter Paralympics – Men's 10 km Classic =

Men's 10 km Classic at the X Paralympic Winter Games
- Paralympic cross-country skiing
- Venue: Whistler Olympic Park
- Dates: March 18

The Men's 10 km Classic competition of the Vancouver 2010 Paralympics was held at Whistler Olympic Park in Whistler, British Columbia. The competition took place on Thursday, March 18.

== Visually impaired ==
In the cross-country skiing 10 km Classic visually impaired, the athlete with a visual impairment has a sighted guide. The two skiers are considered a team, and dual medals are awarded.

Rank	Bib	Name	Country	Time	Difference
1st place, gold medalist(s)	11	Brian McKeever; Guide: Robin McKeever	Canada	26:01.6	
2nd place, silver medalist(s)	9	Helge Flo; Guide: Thomas Losnegard	Norway	27:27.3	+1:25.7
3rd place, bronze medalist(s)	13	Nikolay Polukhin; Guide: Andrey Tokarev	Russia	27:40.7	+1:39.1
4	14	Vasili Shaptsiaboi; Guide: Mikalai Shablouski	Belarus	27:46.4	+1:44.8
5	1	Oleg Munts; Guide: Borys Babar	Ukraine	28:55.6	+2:54.0
6	15	Hak-Su Im; Guide: Yoon-Bae Park	South Korea	29:07.2	+3:05.6
7	19	Frank Höfle; Guide: Johannes Wachlin	Germany	29:21.9	+3:20.3
8	18	Iurii Utkin; Guide: Vitaliy Kazakov	Ukraine	30:06.7	+4:05.1
9	7	Zebastian Modin; Guide: Albin Ackerot	Sweden	30:21.5	+4:19.9
10	17	Valery Kupchinskiy; Guide: Viacheslav Dubov	Russia	30:59.5	+4:53.9
11	10	Jarmo Ollanketo; Guide: Marko Tormanen	Finland	31:46.8	+5:45.2
12	3	Hakan Axelsson; Guide: Mattias Westman	Sweden	33:12.5	+7:10.9
13	2	Rudolf Klemetti; Guide: Lasse Torpo	Finland	33:34.0	+7:32.4
14	4	Alexei Novikov; Guide: Jamie Stirling	Canada	35:21.9	+9:20.3
15	12	Aleksandar Stoyanov; Guide: Iskren Plankov	Bulgaria	36:27.3	+10:25.7
	5	Ivaylo Vatov; Guide: Yordan Lebanov	Bulgaria	DNF	
	6	Vitaliy Lukyanenko; Guide: Volodymyr Ivanov	Ukraine	DNS	
	8	Thomas Clarion; Guide: Stephane Passeron	France	DNS	
	16	Dmytro Shulga; Guide: Sergiy Kucheryaviy	Ukraine	DNS	

== Sitting ==
Rank	Bib	Name	Country	Time	Difference
1st place, gold medalist(s)	24	Irek Zaripov	Russia	27:12.1	
2nd place, silver medalist(s)	31	Enzo Masiello	Italy	28:21.1	+1:09.0
3rd place, bronze medalist(s)	27	Dzmitry Loban	Belarus	28:25.1	+1:13.0
4	30	Iurii Kostiuk	Ukraine	28:25.6	+1:13.5
5	33	Roman Petushkov	Russia	28:27.6	+1:15.5
6	22	Vladimir Kiselev	Russia	28:32.4	+1:20.3
7	28	Sean Halsted	United States	28:35.8	+1:23.7
8	34	Aliaksandr Davidovich	Belarus	28:38.0	+1:25.9
9	29	Trygve Toskedal Larsen	Norway	28:44.4	+1:32.3
10	21	Fu Chunshan	China	29:02.6	+1:50.5
11	11	Georges Bettega	France	29:05.6	+1:53.5
12	23	Andy Soule	United States	29:18.7	+2:06.6
13	13	Vladimir Gajdiciar	Slovakia	29:19.3	+2:07.2
14	17	Alain Marguerettaz	France	29:30.0	+2:17.9
15	7	Sergey Shilov	Russia	29:36.8	+2:24.7
16	26	Chris Klebl	United States	29:39.7	+2:27.6
17	14	Yauheni Lukyanenka	Belarus	29:43.6	+2:31.5
18	32	Romain Rosique	France	30:09.2	+2:57.1
19	5	Sergiy Khyzhnyak	Ukraine	30:09.4	+2:57.3
20	15	Robert Wator	Poland	30:15.8	+3:03.7
21	20	Roland Rüpp	Italy	30:20.5	+3:08.4
22	12	Dominic Monypenny	Australia	30:26.7	+3:14.6
23	25	Kamil Rosiek	Poland	30:30.7	+3:18.6
24	19	Greg Mallory	United States	30:35.3	+3:23.2
25	16	Bruno Huber	Switzerland	30:47.6	+3:35.5
26	2	Barys Pronka	Belarus	30:50.3	+3:38.2
27	10	Ruslan Samchenko	Ukraine	31:10.8	+3:58.7
28	18	Per Fagerhoi	Norway	31:34.9	+4:22.8
29	9	Lou Gibson	Canada	31:50.4	+4:38.3
30	8	Fabrizio Bove	Italy	32:46.0	+5:33.9
31	3	Manfred Lehner	Austria	32:53.2	+5:41.1
32	1	Thierry Raoux	France	33:15.8	+6:03.7
33	4	Sebastien Fortier	Canada	33:20.5	+6:08.4
	6	Sylwester Flis	Poland		

== Standing ==
Rank	Bib	Name	Country	Time	Difference
1st place, gold medalist(s)	26	Yoshihiro Nitta	Japan	26:29.5	
2nd place, silver medalist(s)	29	Kirill Mikhaylov	Russia	27:01.7	+32.2
3rd place, bronze medalist(s)	30	Grygorii Vovchinskyi	Ukraine	27:03.7	+34.2
4	23	Vegard Dahle	Norway	27:32.8	+1:03.3
5	20	Tino Uhlig	Germany	28:22.4	+1:52.9
6	14	Oleg Balukhto	Russia	28:26.2	+1:56.7
7	16	Vyacheslav Laykov	Russia	28:36.4	+2:06.9
8	7	Rushan Minnegulov	Russia	28:42.2	+2:12.7
9	25	Ilkka Tuomisto	Finland	28:46.3	+2:16.8
10	9	Vitalii Sytnyk	Ukraine	29:14.2	+2:44.7
11	10	Oleh Leshchyshyn	Ukraine	29:33.4	+3:03.9
12	22	Mark Arendz	Canada	29:45.8	+3:16.3
13	11	Vladimir Kononov	Russia	29:57.9	+3:28.4
14	24	Michael Kurz	Austria	30:56.2	+4:26.7
15	3	Zou Dexin	China	30:56.9	+4:27.4
16	27	Alfis Makamedinov	Russia	31:16.0	+4:46.5
17	2	Valery Darovskikh	Russia	31:29.3	+4:59.8
18	18	Yannick Bourseaux	France	31:43.4	+5:13.9
19	15	Du Haitao	China	31:57.2	+5:27.7
20	12	Kenji Takigami	Japan	32:21.4	+5:51.9
21	5	Thomas Oelsner	Germany	33:03.6	+6:34.1
22	19	James Millar	Australia	33:12.7	+6:43.2
23	1	Tyler Mosher	Canada	34:02.2	+7:32.7
24	4	Zorig Enkhbaatar	Mongolia	37:36.2	+11:06.7
25	17	Sunkhbaatar Nyamaa	Mongolia	50:23.1	+23:53.6
26	8	Oleg Syssolyatin	Kazakhstan	53:31.3	+27:01.8
	6	Li Bo	China	DNF	
	21	Siarhei Silchanka	Belarus	DNF	
	28	Svein Lilleberg	Norway	DNS	
	13	Cheng Shishuai	China	DSQ	
