= Grygorii Vovchynskyi =

Ukrainian paralympic athlete (born 1988)

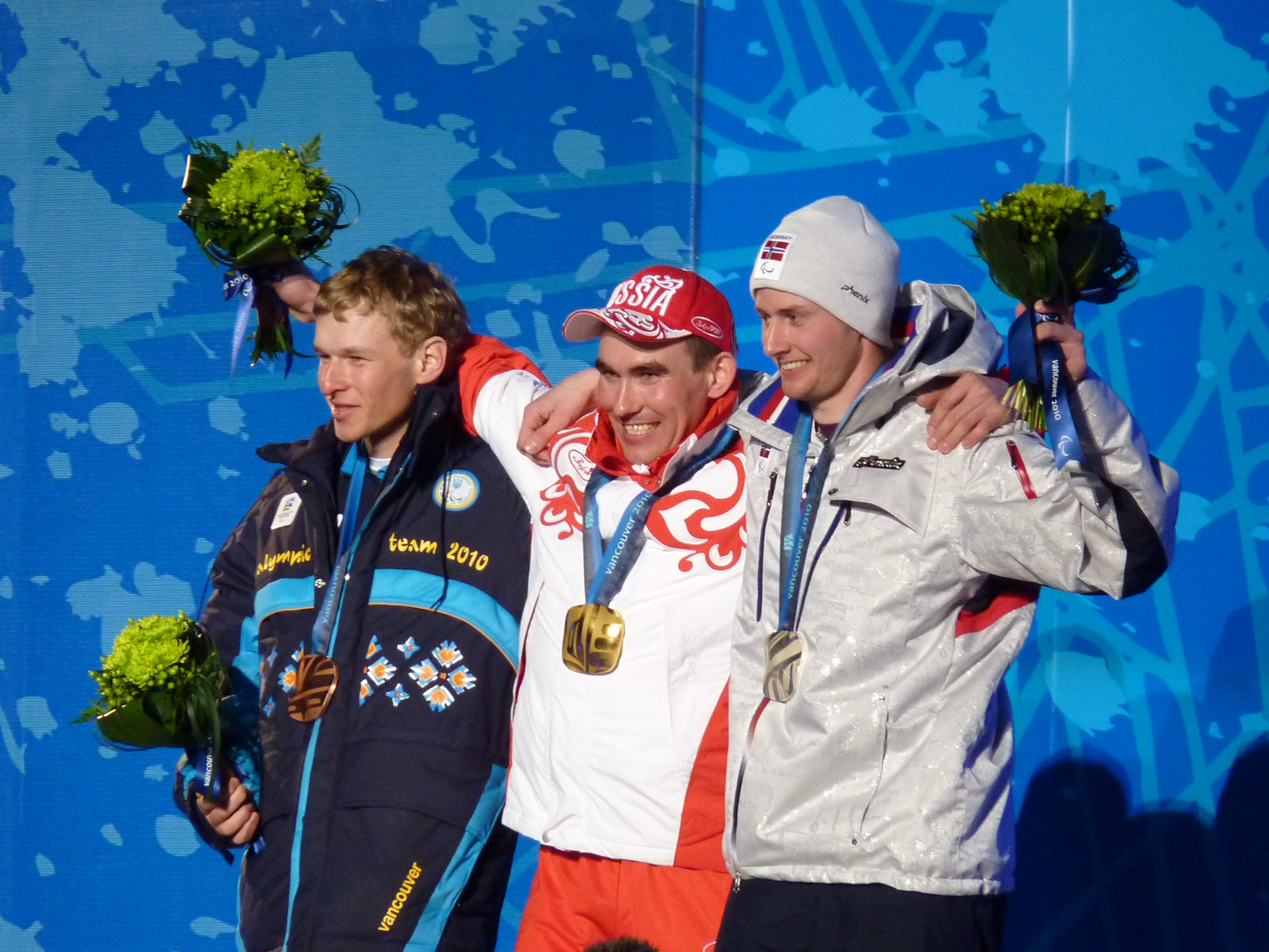
- From left to right: Grygorii Vovchynskyi of Ukraine (bronze), Kirill Mikhaylov of Russia (gold), and Nils-Erik Ulset of Norway (silver) with the medals they earned in biathlon at the 2010 Winter Paralympics – Men's 3 km pursuit.

Personal information
- Full name: Grygorii Vasylovych Vovchynskyi
- Born: 4 July 1988 (age 38) Bilousivka, Drabiv Raion, Cherkasy Oblast, Ukrainian SSR, Soviet Union

Sport
- Sport: Skiing
Medal record
Representing Ukraine
Paralympic Games
Men's para cross-country skiing
Gold medal – first place	2022 Beijing	4 × 2.5 km open relay
Silver medal – second place	2010 Vancouver	1x4/2x5 km relay
Silver medal – second place	2018 Pyeongchang	10 km, standing
Bronze medal – third place	2010 Vancouver	10 km, standing
Bronze medal – third place	2022 Beijing	1.5km standing
Men's para biathlon
Gold medal – first place	2014 Sochi	15 km, standing
Gold medal – first place	2022 Beijing	6 km, standing
Silver medal – second place	2010 Vancouver	12.5 km, standing
Silver medal – second place	2022 Beijing	10km, standing
Bronze medal – third place	2010 Vancouver	3 km pursuit, standing
Bronze medal – third place	2022 Beijing	12.5km standing
Silver medal – second place	2026 Milano Cortina	Sprint pursuit standing
World Championships
Men's para cross-country skiing
Silver medal – second place	2023 Östersund	Free style, standing
Bronze medal – third place	2009 Vuokatti	1x4/2x5 km relay
Bronze medal – third place	2011 Khanty-Mansiysk	1x4/2x5 km relay
Bronze medal – third place	2017 Finsterau	1.5 km, standing
Bronze medal – third place	2019 Prince George	15 km, standing
Bronze medal – third place	2019 Prince George	7.5 km, standing
Bronze medal – third place	2023 Östersund	18 km, standing
Bronze medal – third place	2023 Östersund	4 × 2.5 km open relay
Men's para biathlon
Gold medal – first place	2011 Khanty-Mansiysk	12.5 km, standing
Gold medal – first place	2011 Khanty-Mansiysk	3.6 km pursuit, standing
Silver medal – second place	2013 Sollefteå	6 km, standing
Silver medal – second place	2013 Sollefteå	10 km, standing
Silver medal – second place	2019 Prince George	7.5 km, standing
Silver medal – second place	2023 Östersund	10 km, standing
Silver medal – second place	2023 Östersund	12.5 km, standing
Bronze medal – third place	2017 Finsterau	12.5 km, standing
Bronze medal – third place	2019 Prince George	15 km, standing
Bronze medal – third place	2021 Lillehammer	6 km, standing

Grygorii Vasylovych Vovchynskyi (Ukrainian: Григорій Васильович Вовчинський, born 4 July 1988) is a Ukrainian biathlete, cross-country skier, and Paralympian. He is classified LW8 (single arm amputation), and competes in classification category standing.

== Career ==
He finished the Cherkasy National University (2012).

He competed in biathlon and cross-country skiing at the 2010 Winter Paralympics in Vancouver, Canada. In cross-country skiing he won silver in the men's relay, open with Iurii Kostiuk, Vitaliy Lukyanenko and Volodymyr Ivanov, and a bronze medal in the 10 km, standing. He placed 6th in the men's 1 km sprint and 15th in the 20 km, standing. In biathlon, he took the silver medal in the 12.5 km, and the bronze medal in the men's 3 km pursuit, standing.

He competed at the 2022 Winter Paralympics, winning a gold medal in Men's 6 kilometres Biathlon, standing.
