= Cross-country skiing at the Winter Paralympics =

- Governing body: IPC
- Events: 27 (men: 16; women: 11)

Games
- 1976; 1980; 1984; 1988; 1992; 1994; 1998; 2002; 2006; 2010; 2014; 2018; 2022; 2026
- Medalists

Cross-country skiing has been contested at the Winter Paralympic Games since the first Winter Games in 1976.

== Summary ==
Games	Year	Events	Best Nation
1	1976	25	Finland
2	1980	27	Finland
3	1984	35	Finland
4	1988	38	Norway
5	1992	27	Unified Team
6	1994	48	Norway
7	1998	39	Russia
8	2002	32	Norway
9	2006	20	Russia
10	2010	20	Russia
11	2014	20	Russia
12	2018	20	United States
13	2022	20	China
14	2026	20	United States

== Events ==
Event	Class	76	80	84	88	92	94	98	02	06	10	14	18	22	26	Years
Current program
20 km men	Standing			•	•	• •	• • • •	•	•	•	•	8				
20 km men	Visually impaired		• •				• • •	•	•	•	•	6				
15 km men	Sitting						• •	•	•	•	•	5				
10 km men	Standing	• • • •	• • • • •	• • • • • •	• • •	•	• • • •		• •	•	•	9				
10 km men	Visually impaired	• •	• •	• • • •		• • •	• • •		• • •	•	•	8				
10 km men	Sitting			• •	• •	• •	• •	• • •	• • •	•	•	8				
1 km men	Standing										•	1				
1 km men	Visually impaired										•	1				
1 km men	Sitting										•	1				
1 x 4 km/ 2 x 5 km men	Standing/ Visually impaired/ Sitting										•	1				
3 x 2.5 km women	Standing/ Visually impaired/ Sitting						•	•	•	•	•	5				
15 km women	Standing							•	•	•	•	4				
15 km women	Visually impaired							•	•	•	•	4				
10 km women	Sitting		•				•	•	•	•	•	6				
5 km women	Standing	• • •	•	• •	• •	•	• • • •	• •	•	•	•	10				
5 km women	Visually impaired	• •	• •	• •	• • •	• •	• • • • • •	• • • •	• •	•	•	10				
5 km women	Sitting		•	•	• •	•	•	•	•	•	•	9				
1 km women	Standing										•	1				
1 km women	Visually impaired										•	1				
1 km women	Sitting										•	1				
Past events
3 x 10 km men	Standing	•										1				
3 x 10 km men	Visually impaired	•										1				
3 x 5 km men	Standing	•										1				
3 x 5 km men	Visually impaired					•						1				
3 x 2.5 km men	Sitting			•	•	•	•	•				5				
4 x 10 km men	Visually impaired		•	•	•							3				
4 x 5 km men	Standing		•	•	•	•						4				
4 x 5 km men	Standing / Visually impaired						•	•				2				
30 km men	Visually impaired				• • •	• • •						2				
20 km men	Intellectual disability							•				1				
15 km men	Standing				• •			• •				1				
15 km men	Visually impaired	• •			• • •			• • •				3				
15 km men	Intellectual disability							•				1				
5 km men	Standing	• • • •	• • • • •	• • • • •	• • • •	• • •	• • • •	• •	• •	•		9				
5 km men	Visually impaired						• • •	• • •	• • •	•		4				
5 km men	Sitting		•	• •	• •	• •	• •	• • •	• • •	•		8				
5 km men	Intellectual disability							•				1				
1 x 2.5 km/ 2 x 5 km men	Standing/ Visually impaired/ Sitting								•			1				
1 x 3.75 km/ 2 x 5 km men	Standing/ Visually impaired/ Sitting									•		1				
3 x 5 km women	Standing			•								1				
3 x 5 km women	Visually impaired	•			•							2				
15 km women	Intellectual disability							•				1				
10 km women	Standing	• •	• •	• •	• •	•	• •		•	•		8				
10 km women	Visually impaired	• •	• •	• •	• • •	• •	• • •		• •	•		8				
5 km women	Intellectual disability							• •				1				
2.5 km women	Sitting			•	• •	•	•	•	•	•		7				
4 x 5 km women	Visually impaired		•	•								2				
Total Events		25	27	35	38	27	48	39	32	20	20					

== Medal table ==
NPCs in italics no longer compete at the Winter Paralympics

As of 2026 Winter Paralympics

Rank	Nation	Gold	Silver	Bronze	Total
1	Norway (NOR)	79	51	37	167
2	Finland (FIN)	65	47	53	165
3	Russia (RUS)	57	53	39	149
4	Germany (GER)	35	59	34	128
5	Canada (CAN)	25	7	17	49
6	United States (USA)	18	21	12	51
7	Ukraine (UKR)	16	25	26	67
8	France (FRA)	15	10	20	45
9	Sweden (SWE)	14	20	27	61
10	Austria (AUT)	11	19	20	50
11	Poland (POL)	11	6	19	36
12	China (CHN)	10	10	11	31
13	Unified Team	9	8	3	20
14	Belarus (BLR)	8	10	10	28
15	Switzerland (SUI)	5	11	22	38
16	Italy (ITA)	4	4	10	18
17	Japan (JPN)	4	3	2	9
–	Neutral Paralympic Athletes	2	4	3	9
18	South Korea (KOR)	2	2	1	5
19	Kazakhstan (KAZ)	1	1	1	3
20	Denmark (DEN)	1	0	2	3
21	Netherlands (NED)	0	4	3	7
22	Spain (ESP)	0	2	1	3
23	Czech Republic (CZE)	0	2	0	2
24	Czechoslovakia	0	1	1	2
25	Brazil (BRA)	0	1	0	1
25	Slovakia (SVK)	0	1	0	1
27	Great Britain (GBR)	0	0	2	2
27	Soviet Union	0	0	2	2
29	Estonia (EST)	0	0	1	1
Totals (29 entries)		392	382	379	1,153

== See also ==
- Cross-country skiing at the Winter Olympics
