= Cross-country skiing at the 2010 Winter Paralympics – Men's 1 km Sprint Classic =

Men's 1 km Sprint Classic at the X Paralympic Winter Games
- Paralympic cross-country skiing
- Venue: Whistler Olympic Park
- Dates: March 21

The Men's 1 km Sprint Classic competition of the Vancouver 2010 Paralympics was held at Whistler Olympic Park in Whistler, British Columbia. The competition was held on Sunday, March 21.

== Visually impaired ==
In the cross-country skiing 1 km Sprint visually impaired, the athlete with a visual impairment has a sighted guide. The two skiers are considered a team, and dual medals are awarded.

=== Qualification ===
Rank	Bib	Name	Country	Time	Difference
1	16	Brian McKeever; Guide: Robin McKeever	Canada	3:14.79	
2	17	Zebastian Modin; Guide: Albin Ackerot	Sweden	3:19.52	+4.73
3	6	Frank Höfle; Guide: Johannes Wachlin	Germany	3:25.74	+10.95
4	5	Hak-Su Im; Guide: Yoon-Bae Park	South Korea	3:25.82	+11.03
5	2	Nikolay Polukhin; Guide: Andrey Tokarev	Russia	3:27.94	+13.15
6	10	Vitaliy Lukyanenko; Guide: Volodymyr Ivanov	Ukraine	3:29.77	+14.98
7	8	Wilhelm Brem; Guide: Florian Grimm	Germany	3:31.94	+17.15
8	19	Jarmo Ollanketo; Guide: Marko Tormanen	Finland	3:32.57	+17.78
9	7	Vasili Shaptsiaboi; Guide: Mikalai Shablouski	Belarus	3:32.99	+18.20
10	15	Helge Flo; Guide: Thomas Losnegard	Norway	3:33.64	+18.85
11	3	Dmytro Shulga; Guide: Sergiy Kucheryaviy	Ukraine	3:33.76	+18.97
12	4	Iurii Utkin; Guide: Vitaliy Kazakov	Ukraine	3:33.93	+19.14
13	1	Valery Kupchinskiy; Guide: Viacheslav Dubov	Russia	3:36.89	+22.10
14	13	Marian Balaz; No guide	Slovakia	3:37.34	+22.55
15	14	Thomas Clarion; Guide: Tommy Terraz	France	3:38.48	+23.69
16	11	Hakan Axelsson; Guide: Mattias Westman	Sweden	3:40.39	+25.60
17	18	Oleg Munts; Guide: Borys Babar	Ukraine	3:41.52	+26.73
18	9	Rudolf Klemetti; Guide: Lasse Torpo	Finland	3:53.02	+38.23
19	12	Alexei Novikov; Guide: Jamie Stirling	Canada	3:56.34	+41.55
20	21	Aleksandar Stoyanov; Guide: Iskren Plankov	Bulgaria	4:12.36	+47.57
21	20	Ivaylo Vatov; Guide: Yordan Lebanov	Bulgaria	6:33.03	+3:18.24

=== Finals ===
==== Semifinal 1 ====
Rank	Bib	Name	Country	Time	Difference
1	1	Brian McKeever; Guide: Robin McKeever	Canada	3:20.6	
2	5	Nikolay Polukhin; Guide: Andrey Tokarev	Russia	3:21.3	+0.7
3	8	Jarmo Ollanketo; Guide: Marko Tormanen	Finland	3:29.6	+9.0
4	4	Hak-Su Im; Guide: Yoon-Bae Park	South Korea	3:32.5	+11.9

==== Semifinal 2 ====
Rank	Bib	Name	Country	Time	Difference
1	2	Zebastian Modin; Guide: Albin Ackerot	Sweden	3:50.0	
2	3	Frank Höfle; Guide: Johannes Wachlin	Germany	3:54.1	+4.1
3	6	Vitaliy Lukyanenko; Guide: Volodymyr Ivanov	Ukraine	4:01.5	+11.5
4	7	Wilhelm Brem; Guide: Florian Grimm	Germany	4:08.6	+18.6

==== Final ====
Rank	Bib	Name	Country	Time	Difference
1st place, gold medalist(s)	1	Brian McKeever; Guide: Robin McKeever	Canada	3:42.9	
2nd place, silver medalist(s)	5	Nikolay Polukhin; Guide: Andrey Tokarev	Russia	3:47.0	+4.1
3rd place, bronze medalist(s)	2	Zebastian Modin; Guide: Albin Ackerot	Sweden	3:50.2	+7.3
4	3	Frank Höfle; Guide: Johannes Wachlin	Germany	3:55.5	+12.6

== Sitting ==
=== Qualification ===
Rank	Bib	Name	Country	Time	Difference
1	10	Roman Petushkov	Russia	2:08.18	
2	12	Irek Zaripov	Russia	2:10.39	+2.21
3	14	Sergey Shilov	Russia	2:12.86	+4.68
4	5	Vladimir Kiselev	Russia	2:14.28	+6.10
5	3	Iurii Kostiuk	Ukraine	2:15.89	+7.71
6	9	Trygve Toskedal Larsen	Norway	2:16.10	+7.92
7	6	Dzmitry Loban	Belarus	2:16.44	+8.26
8	32	Alain Marguerettaz	France	2:17.97	+9.79
9	2	Chris Klebl	United States	2:18.39	+10.21
10	13	Sean Halsted	United States	2:21.55	+13.37
11	8	Andy Soule	United States	2:19.77	+11.59
12	1	Aliaksandr Davidovich	Belarus	2:19.95	+11.77
13	30	Per Fagerhoi	Norway	2:20.65	+12.47
14	34	Fu Chunshan	China	2:20.69	+12.51
15	27	Sergiy Khzyhnyak	Ukraine	2:21.38	+13.20
16	4	Kamil Rosiek	Poland	2:21.64	+13.46
17	20	Yauheni Lukyanenka	Belarus	2:21.66	+13.48
18	25	Greg Mallory	United States	2:21.89	+13.71
19	35	Georges Bettega	France	2:22.66	+14.48
20	7	Enzo Masiello	Italy	2:22.76	+14.58
21	23	Kozo Kubo	Japan	2:23.50	+15.32
22	16	Vladimir Gajdiciar	Slovakia	2:24.09	+15.91
23	22	Ruslan Samchenko	Ukraine	2:27.13	+18.95
24	29	Roland Rüpp	Italy	2:27.15	+18.97
25	33	Barys Pronka	Belarus	2:27.30	+19.12
26	31	Dominic Monypenny	Australia	2:27.60	+19.42
27	15	Sylwester Flis	Poland	2:27.94	+19.76
28	28	Bruno Huber	Switzerland	2:28.85	+20.67
29	26	Lou Gibson	Canada	2:30.53	+22.35
30	24	Robert Wator	Poland	2:30.99	+22.81
31	19	Manfred Lehner	Austria	2:35.25	+27.07
32	17	Sebastien Fortier	Canada	2:36.37	+28.19
33	21	Thierry Raoux	France	2:37.63	+29.45
34	18	Hiroyuki Nagata	Japan	2:44.61	+36.43
35	11	Romain Rosique	France	2:54.66	+46.48

=== Finals ===
==== Semifinal 1 ====
Rank	Bib	Name	Country	Time	Difference
1	4	Vladimir Kiselev	Russia	2:25.9	
2	5	Iurii Kostiuk	Ukraine	2:26.8	+0.9
3	1	Roman Petushkov	Russia	2:30.7	+4.8
4	8	Alain Marguerettaz	France	2:32.2	+6.3

==== Semifinal 2 ====
Rank	Bib	Name	Country	Time	Difference
1	2	Irek Zaripov	Russia	2:32.2	
2	3	Sergey Shilov	Russia	2:33.5	+1.3
3	6	Trygve Toskedal Larsen	Norway	2:33.9	+1.7
4	7	Dzmitry Loban	Belarus	2:35.8	+3.6

==== Final ====
Rank	Bib	Name	Country	Time	Difference
1st place, gold medalist(s)	3	Sergey Shilov	Russia	2:31.8	
2nd place, silver medalist(s)	2	Irek Zaripov	Russia	2:31.9	+0.1
3rd place, bronze medalist(s)	4	Vladimir Kiselev	Russia	2:36.6	+4.8
4	5	Iurii Kostiuk	Ukraine	2:44.3	+12.5

== Standing ==
=== Qualification ===
Rank	Bib	Name	Country	Time	Difference
1	10	Kirill Mikhaylov	Russia	3:13.65	
2	4	Yoshihiro Nitta	Japan	3:15.56	+1.91
3	7	Ilkka Tuomisto	Finland	3:20.69	+7.04
4	6	Vegard Dahle	Norway	3:20.98	+7.33
5	26	Oleg Balukhto	Russia	3:24.61	+10.96
6	9	Tino Uhlig	Germany	3:25.32	+11.77
7	8	Alfis Makamedinov	Russia	3:26.56	+12.91
8	3	Grygorii Vovchinskyi	Ukraine	3:26.67	+13.02
9	2	Mark Arendz	Canada	3:28.85	+15.20
10	19	Jan Kolodziej	Poland	3:29.06	+15.41
11	25	Vyacheslav Laykov	Russia	3:29.44	+15.79
12	16	Vladimir Kononov	Russia	3:31.40	+17.75
13	24	Kjartan Nesbakken Haugen	Norway	3:32.74	+19.09
14	21	Kenji Takigami	Japan	3:36.94	+23.29
15	17	Rushan Minnegulov	Russia	3:42.40	+28.75
16	12	Thomas Oelsner	Germany	3:43.75	+30.10
17	23	Vitalii Sytnyk	Ukraine	3:43.79	+30.14
18	29	Yannick Bourseaux	France	3:43.83	+30.18
19	15	Cheng Shishuai	China	3:45.88	+32.23
20	14	Oleh Leshchyshyn	Ukraine	3:47.45	+33.80
21	28	Tyler Mosher	Canada	3:47.69	+34.04
22	22	James Millar	Australia	3:47.97	+34.32
23	1	Siarhei Silchanka	Belarus	3:50.43	+36.78
24	11	Valery Darovskikh	Russia	3:50.61	+36.96
25	18	Du Haitao	China	3:52.27	+38.62
26	13	Keiichi Sato	Japan	3:52.47	+38.83
27	27	Zou Dexin	China	3:55.83	+42.18
28	31	Zorig Enkhbaatar	Mongolia	4:13.51	+59.86
29	33	Li Bo	China	4:54.00	+1:40.35
30	32	Sukhbaatar Nyamaa	Mongolia	5:25.95	+2:12.30
31	30	Oleg Syssolyatin	Kazakhstan	5:27.14	+2:13.49
	5	Michael Kurz	Austria	DNS	
	20	Josef Giesen	Germany	DNS	

=== Finals ===
==== Semifinal 1 ====
Rank	Bib	Name	Country	Time	Difference
1	1	Kirill Mikhaylov	Russia	3:41.4	
2	4	Vegard Dahle	Norway	3:43.7	+2.3
3	8	Grygorii Vovchinskyi	Ukraine	3:45.8	+4.4
4	5	Oleg Balukhto	Russia	3:53.8	+12.4

==== Semifinal 2 ====
Rank	Bib	Name	Country	Time	Difference
1	2	Yoshihiro Nitta	Japan	3:32.0	
2	3	Ilkka Tuomisto	Finland	3:35.8	+3.8
3	6	Tino Uhlig	Germany	3:37.7	+5.7
4	7	Alfis Makamedinov	Russia	3:37.8	+5.8

==== Final ====
Rank	Bib	Name	Country	Time	Difference
1st place, gold medalist(s)	2	Yoshihiro Nitta	Japan	3:30.7	
2nd place, silver medalist(s)	1	Kirill Mikhaylov	Russia	3:32.3	+1.6
3rd place, bronze medalist(s)	3	Ilkka Tuomisto	Finland	3:33.9	+3.2
4	4	Vegard Dahle	Norway	3:35.0	+4.3

== See also ==
- Cross-country skiing at the 2010 Winter Olympics – Men's sprint
