= Biathlon at the 2010 Winter Paralympics – Men's pursuit =

Men's Pursuit at the X Paralympic Winter Games
- Paralympic biathlon
- Venue: Whistler Olympic Park
- Dates: March 13

The Men's Pursuit competition of the Vancouver 2010 Paralympics is held at Whistler Olympic Park in Whistler, British Columbia. The competition is scheduled for Saturday, March 13.

== 2 x 3 km Visually Impaired ==
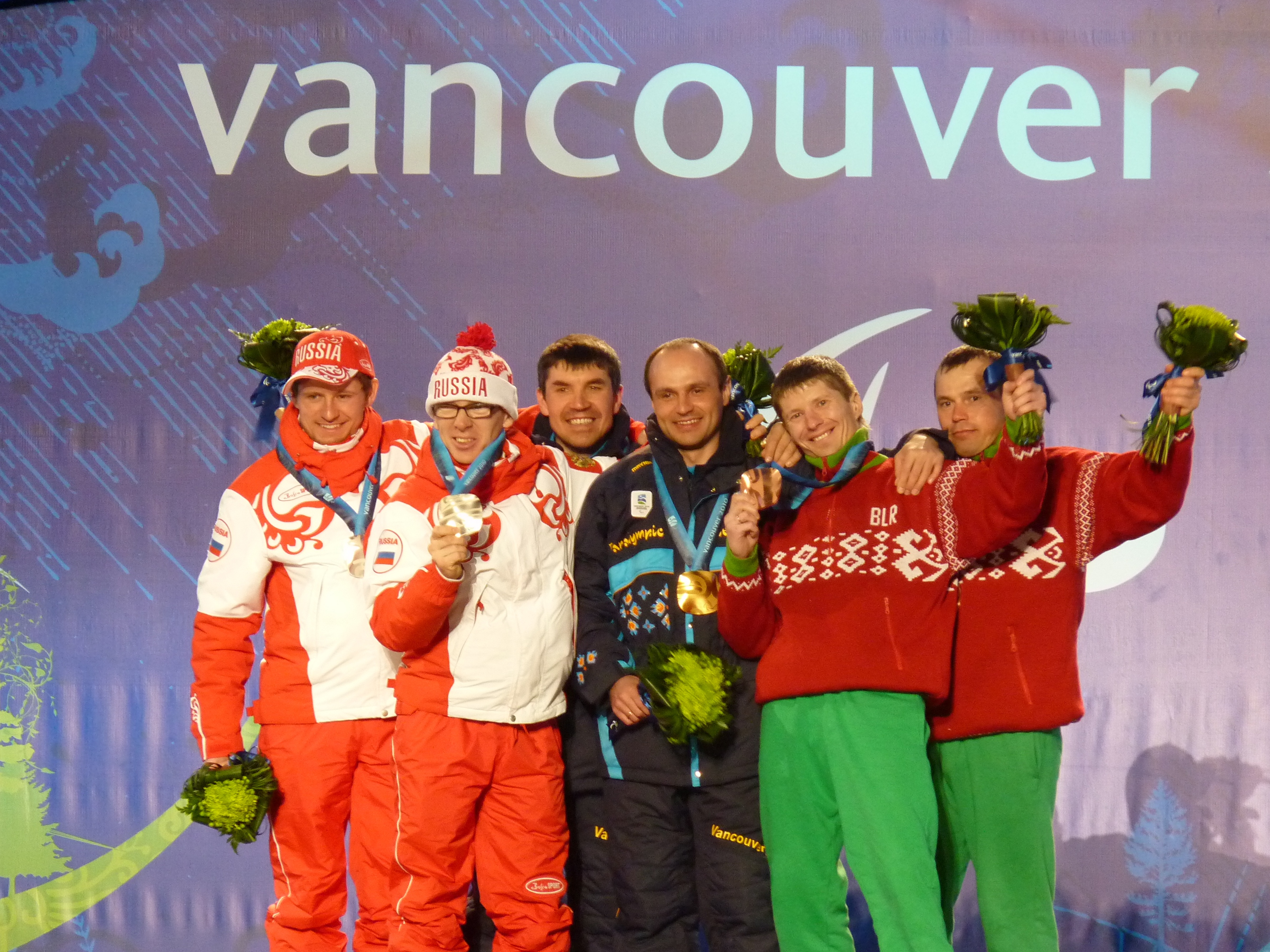
From left to right: Andrey Tokarev (guide) and Nikolay Polukhin of Russia (silver), Volodymyr Ivanov (guide) and Vitaliy Lukyanenko of Ukraine (gold), and Vasili Shaptsiabol and his guide Mikalai Shablouski of Belarus (bronze).

In the biathlon 2 x 3 km visually impaired, the athlete with a visual impairment has a sighted guide. The two skiers are considered a team, and dual medals are awarded.

Rank	Bib	Name	Country	Time Qualification	Rank	Time	Difference
1st place, gold medalist(s)	14	Vitaliy Lukyanenko; Guide: Volodymyr Ivanov	Ukraine	9:24.74	1 Q	10:54.3	
2nd place, silver medalist(s)	12	Nikolay Polukhin; Guide: Andrey Tokarev	Russia	9:42.01	3 Q	11:09.2	+14.9
3rd place, bronze medalist(s)	16	Vasili Shaptsiaboi; Guide: Mikalai Shablouski	Belarus	9:45.64	5 Q	11:16.0	+21.7
4	15	Wilhelm Brem; Guide: Florian Grimm	Germany	9:41.89	2 Q	11:48.3	+54.0
5	13	Irek Mannanov; Guide: Salavat Gumerov	Russia	9:43.17	4 Q	12:01.7	+1:07.4
6	9	Brian McKeever; Guide: Robin McKeever	Canada	10:14.30	6 Q	12:02.7	+1:08.4
7	4	Dmytro Shulga; Guide: Sergei Kucheryaviy	Ukraine	10:45.27	8 Q	12:54.0	+1:59.7
8	11	Thomas Clarion; Guide: Tommy Terraz	France	10:29.32	7 Q	13:09.3	+2:15.0
9	10	Iurii Utkin; Guide: Vitalii Kazakov	Ukraine	11:01.53	9 Q	13:44.5	+2:50.2
10	1	Hak-Su Im; Guide: Yoon-Bae Park	South Korea	11:41.39	10 Q	14:39.5	+3:45.2
11	3	Frank Höfle; Guide: Johannes Wachlin	Germany	12:28.91	11		
12	7	Jarmo Ollanketo; Guide: Marko Toermaenen	Finland	12:46.60	12		
13	2	Alexei Novikov; Guide: Jamie Stirling	Canada	13:31.20	13		
14	8	Hakan Axelsson; Guide: Mattias Westman	Sweden	16:00.07	14		
	5	Marian Balaz; Guide:	Slovakia	DNS			
	6	Zebastian Modin; Guide:	Sweden	DNS			

== 2 x 2.4 km Sitting ==
Rank	Bib	Name	Country	Time Qualification	Rank	Time	Difference
1st place, gold medalist(s)	19	Irek Zaripov	Russia	8:18.84	1 Q	9:51.0	
2nd place, silver medalist(s)	21	Iurii Kostiuk	Ukraine	8:58.99	7 Q	10:38.9	+47.9
3rd place, bronze medalist(s)	25	Andy Soule	United States	8:38.48	3 Q	10:53.1	+1:02.1
4	2	Sergiy Khyzhniak	Ukraine	8:51.21	6 Q	10:59.8	+1:08.8
5	20	Vladimir Kiselev	Russia	8:46.36	4 Q	11:00.9	+1:09.9
6	4	Sergey Shilov	Russia	8:21.67	2 Q	11:04.6	+1:13.6
7	1	Vladimir Gajcidiar	Slovakia	8:46.36	5 Q	11:13.1	+1:22.1
8	3	Aliaksandr Davidovich	Belarus	9:27.86	11 Q	11:44.5	+1:53.5
9	22	Kozo Kubo	Japan	9:05.89	8 Q	12:25.0	+2:34.0
10	5	Bruno Huber	Switzerland	9:11.53	9 Q	12:27.9	+2:36.9
11	12	Romain Rosique	France	9:46.87	12 Q	12:38.0	+2:47.0
12	17	Ruslan Samchenko	Ukraine	9:21.06	10 Q	13:03.4	+3:12.4
13	13	Georges Bettega	France	9:46.97	13		
14	15	Robert Wator	Poland	9:54.47	14		
15	16	Kamil Rosiek	Poland	9:54.83	15		
16	11	Thierry Raoux	France	10:10.25	16		
17	23	Trygve Toskedal Larsen	Norway	10:18.47	17		
18	10	Hiroyuki Nagata	Japan	10:22.93	18		
19	8	Manfred Lehner	Austria	10:29.43	19		
20	18	Roman Petushkov	Russia	10:48.90	20		
21	9	Roland Rüpp	Italy	10:57.59	21		
22	24	Enzo Masiello	Italy	10:58.11	22		
23	6	Lou Gibson	Canada	11:40.26	23		
24	14	Barys Pronka	Belarus	11:57.16	24		
25	7	Sylwester Flis	Poland	12:32.18	25		

== Standing ==
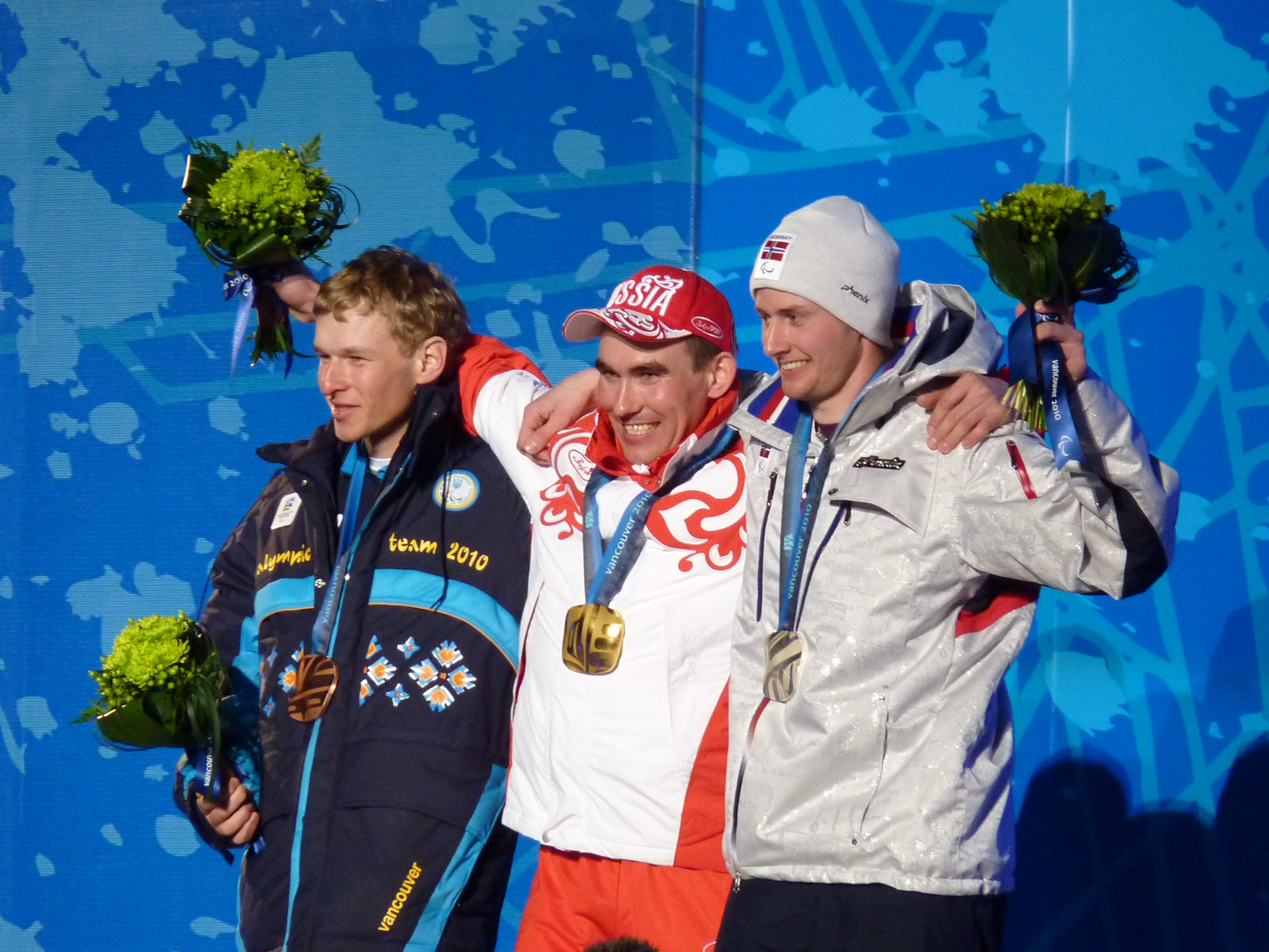
From left to right: Grygorii Vovchynskyi of Ukraine (bronze), Kirill Mikhaylov of Russia (gold), and Nils-Erik Ulset of Norway (silver).

Rank	Bib	Name	Country	Time Qualification	Rank	Time	Difference
1st place, gold medalist(s)	17	Kirill Mikhaylov	Russia	8:55.37	2 Q	10:32.2	
2nd place, silver medalist(s)	18	Nils-Erik Ulset	Norway	9:19.44	3 Q	10:51.3	+19.1
3rd place, bronze medalist(s)	16	Grygorii Vovchynskyi	Ukraine	8:48.50	1 Q	10:58.9	+26.7
4	4	Josef Giesen	Germany	9:32.14	5 Q	10:59.6	+27.4
5	8	Vyacheslav Laykov	Russia	9:43.60	9 Q	11:06.3	+34.1
6	6	Valery Darovskikh	Russia	9:33.99	6 Q	11:06.5	+34.3
7	3	Mark Arendz	Canada	9:39.87	7 Q	11:32.0	+59.8
8	7	Vitalii Sytnyk	Ukraine	9:55.39	12 Q	11:38.4	+1:06.2
9	14	Yannick Bourseaux	France	9:26.20	4 Q	11:45.9	+1:13.7
10	11	Yoshihiro Nitta	Japan	9:55.02	11 Q	11:48.7	+1:16.5
11	1	Oleg Balukhto	Russia	9:54.83	10 Q	11:52.9	+1:20.7
12	2	Keiichi Sato	Japan	9:41.82	8 Q	12:37.1	+2:04.9
	5	Jan Kolodziej	Poland	10:05.62	13		
	9	Thomas Oelsner	Germany	10:06.63	14		
	13	Oleh Leshchyshyn	Ukraine	10:15.14	15		
	10	Alfis Makamedinov	Russia	10:21.03	16		
	12	Rushan Minnegulov	Russia	10:50.07	17		
	19	Siarhei Silchanka	Belarus	10:50.42	18		
	15	Michael Kurz	Austria	11:14.33	19		

== See also ==
- Biathlon at the 2010 Winter Olympics – Men's pursuit
