= Cross-country skiing at the 2010 Winter Paralympics – Men's 20 km Free =

Men's 20 km Free at the X Paralympic Winter Games
- Paralympic cross-country skiing
- Venue: Whistler Olympic Park
- Dates: March 14, March 15,

The Men's 20 km Free competition of the Vancouver 2010 Paralympics was held at Whistler Olympic Park in Whistler, British Columbia. The competition took place on Sunday, March 14, and Monday, March 15.

== Medal summary ==
=== Medal table ===
Rank	Nation	Gold	Silver	Bronze	Total
1	Russia (RUS)	2	2	1	5
2	Canada (CAN)	1	0	0	1
3	Norway (NOR)	0	1	0	1
4	Belarus (BLR)	0	0	1	1
4	Italy (ITA)	0	0	1	1
Totals (5 entries)		3	3	3	9

=== Medalists ===
Games	Gold	Silver	Bronze
20 km Free – visually impaired	Canada (CAN); Brian McKeever; Guide: Robin McKeever	Russia (RUS); Nikolay Polukhin; Guide: Andrey Tokarev	Belarus (BLR); Vasili Shaptsiaboi; Guide: Mikalai Shablouski
15 km – Sitting	Russia (RUS); Irek Zaripov	Russia (RUS); Roman Petushkov	Italy (ITA); Enzo Masiello
20 km Free – Standing	Russia (RUS); Kirill Mikhaylov	Norway (NOR); Nils-Erik Ulset	Russia (RUS); Vladimir Kononov

== Visually impaired ==
In the cross-country skiing 20 km Free visually impaired, the athlete with a visual impairment has a sighted guide. The two skiers are considered a team, and dual medals are awarded.

Rank	Bib	Name	Country	Time	Difference
1st place, gold medalist(s)	7	Brian McKeever; Guide: Robin McKeever	Canada	51:14.7	
2nd place, silver medalist(s)	11	Nikolay Polukhin; Guide: Andrey Tokarev	Russia	51:55.6	+40.9
3rd place, bronze medalist(s)	14	Vasili Shaptsiaboi; Guide: Mikalai Shablouski	Belarus	52:22.5	+1:07.8
4	4	Wilhelm Brem; Guide: Florian Grimm	Germany	52:28.9	+1:14.2
5	12	Frank Höfle; Guide: Johannes Wachlin	Germany	52:38.8	+1:24.1
6	5	Thomas Clarion; Guide: Stephane Passeron	France	52:39.8	+1:25.1
7	9	Oleg Munts; Guide: Borys Babar	Ukraine	53:03.8	+1:49.1
8	6	Helge Flo; Guide: Thomas Losnegard	Norway	54:22.7	+3:08.0
9	10	Hak-Su Im; Guide: Yoon-Bae Park	South Korea	55:53.6	+4:28.9
10	13	Valery Kupchinskiy; Guide: Viacheslav Dubov	Russia	57:03.8	+5:49.1
11	8	Zebastian Modin; Guide: Albin Ackerot	Sweden	58:30.8	+7:16.1
12	1	Rudolf Klemetti; Guide: Lasse Torpo	Finland	1:02:35.6	+11:20.9
13	3	Alexei Novikov; Guide: Jamie Stirling	Canada	1:08:47.6	+17:32.9
	2	Hakan Axelsson	Sweden	DNF	

== Sitting (15 km) ==
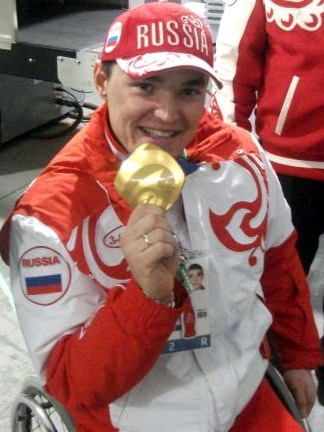
Irek Zaripov after winning his gold medal

Rank	Bib	Name	Country	Time	Difference
1st place, gold medalist(s)	22	Irek Zaripov	Russia	41:01.1	
2nd place, silver medalist(s)	25	Roman Petushkov	Russia	41:11.1	+10.0
3rd place, bronze medalist(s)	24	Enzo Masiello	Italy	41:54.9	+43.8
4	21	Trygve Toskedal Larsen	Norway	42:17.3	+1:16.2
5	23	Iurii Kostiuk	Ukraine	42:17.7	+1:16.6
6	26	Aliaksandr Davidovich	Belarus	42:43.1	+1:42.0
7	19	Kozo Kubo	Japan	42:55.5	+1:54.4
8	20	Chris Klebl	United States	43:13.7	+2:12.6
9	28	Sean Halsted	United States	43:25.6	+2:24.5
10	27	Andy Soule	United States	43:32.8	+2:31.7
11	30	Dzmitry Loban	Belarus	43:53.5	+2:52.4
12	29	Romain Rosique	France	43:56.6	+2:55.5
13	3	Sergey Shilov	Russia	44:15.5	+3:14.4
14	18	Fu Chunshan	China	44:19.1	+3:18.0
15	7	Yauheni Lukyanenka	Belarus	44:22.0	+3:20.9
16	1	Vladimir Gajdiciar	Slovakia	44:39.0	+3:37.9
17	17	Dominic Monypenny	Australia	44:55.7	+3:54.6
18	13	Alain Marguerettaz	France	44:55.8	+3:54.7
19	2	Ivan Goncharov	Russia	45:19.2	+4:18.1
20	31	Kamil Rosiek	Poland	45:21.2	+4:20.1
21	10	Robert Wator	Poland	45:25.9	+4:24.8
22	4	Barys Pronka	Belarus	45:57.7	+4:56.6
23	15	Roland Rüpp	Italy	46:08.7	+5:07.6
24	11	Georges Bettega	France	46:16.7	+5:15.6
25	14	Per Fagerhoi	Norway	46:23.0	+5:21.9
26	12	Greg Mallory	United States	46:30.6	+5:29.5
27	8	Lou Gibson	Canada	47:53.8	+6:52.7
28	5	Fabrizio Bove	Italy	49:15.2	+8:14.1
29	16	Sebastien Fortier	Canada	51:33.6	+10:32.5
	6	Manfred Lehner	Austria	DNF	
	9	Thierry Raoux	France	DNS	

== Standing ==
Rank	Bib	Name	Country	Time	Difference
1st place, gold medalist(s)	20	Kirill Mikhaylov	Russia	52:07.7	
2nd place, silver medalist(s)	7	Nils-Erik Ulset	Norway	53:34.1	+1:26.4
3rd place, bronze medalist(s)	6	Vladimir Kononov	Russia	53:53.4	+1:45.7
4	18	Siarhei Silchanka	Belarus	54:51.6	+2:43.9
5	2	Rushan Minnegulov	Russia	54:59.8	+2:52.1
6	17	Michael Kurz	Austria	55:06.8	+2:59.1
7	5	Du Haitao	China	55:29.9	+3:22.2
8	16	Vegard Dahle	Norway	55:42.9	+3:35.2
9	11	Yannick Bourseaux	France	55:55.7	+3:48.0
10	1	Thomas Oelsner	Germany	58:02.6	+5:54.9
11	19	Ilkka Tuomisto	Finland	58:29.6	+6:21.9
12	15	Tino Uhlig	Germany	59:00.8	+6:53.1
13	12	Zou Dexin	China	59:37.4	+7:29.7
14	10	Oleh Leshchyshyn	Ukraine	59:44.9	+7:37.2
15	21	Grygorii Vovchynskyi	Ukraine	59:50.6	+7:42.9
16	8	Cheng Shishuai	China	59:52.1	+7:44.4
17	4	Keiichi Sato	Japan	1:01:34.5	+9:26.8
18	9	James Millar	Australia	1:02:33.5	+10:25.8
19	22	Svein Lilleberg	Norway	1:06:33.0	+14:25.3
	3	Tyler Mosher	Canada	DNF	
	14	Alfis Makamedinov	Russia	DNF	
	13	Mark Arendz	Canada	DNS	
