= Biathlon at the 2010 Winter Paralympics – Men's individual =

Men's Individual at the X Paralympic Winter Games
- Paralympic biathlon
- Venue: Whistler Olympic Park
- Dates: March 17, 2010

The Men's individual competition of the Vancouver 2010 Paralympics was held at Whistler Olympic Park in Whistler, British Columbia on Wednesday, March 17, 2010.

== 12.5 km Visually Impaired ==
In the biathlon 12.5 km visually impaired, the athlete with a visual impairment has a sighted guide. The two skiers are considered a team, and dual medals are awarded.

Rank	Bib	Name	Country	Time	Difference
1st place, gold medalist(s)	7	Wilhelm Brem; Guide: Florian Grimm	Germany	38:28.6	
2nd place, silver medalist(s)	11	Nikolay Polukhin; Guide: Andrey Tokarev	Russia	38:32.7	+4.1
3rd place, bronze medalist(s)	10	Vitaliy Lukyanenko; Guide: Volodymyr Ivanov	Ukraine	38:55.5	+26.9
4	9	Vasili Shaptsiaboi; Guide: Mikalai Shablouski	Belarus	40:47.6	+2:19.0
5	4	Thomas Clarion; Guide: Stephane Passeron	France	41:44.9	+3:16.3
6	3	Oleg Munts; Guide: Borys Babar	Ukraine	45:58.3	+7:29.7
7	8	Irek Mannanov; Guide: Salavat Gumerov	Russia	46:18.0	+7:49.4
8	5	Dmytro Shulga; Guide: Sergiy Kucheryaviy	Ukraine	50:19.6	+11:51.0
9	1	Iurii Utkin; Guide: Vitaliy Kazakov	Ukraine	51:05.5	+12:36.9
10	2	Alexei Novikov; Guide: Jamie Stirling	Canada	56:30.2	+18.01.6
	6	Brian McKeever; Guide: Robin McKeever	Canada	DNS	

== 12.5 km Sitting ==
Rank	Bib	Name	Country	Time	Difference
1st place, gold medalist(s)	17	Irek Zaripov	Russia	42:22.4	
2nd place, silver medalist(s)	21	Vladimir Kiselev	Russia	42:29.9	+7.5
3rd place, bronze medalist(s)	15	Roman Petushkov	Russia	43:11.0	+48.6
4	20	Andy Soule	United States	44:26.2	+2:03.8
5	19	Iurii Kostiuk	Ukraine	44:33.8	+2:11.4
6	16	Kozo Kubo	Japan	44:39.6	+2:17.2
7	18	Trygve Toskedal Larsen	Norway	47:15.5	+4:53.1
8	6	Sergey Shilov	Russia	47:16.5	+4:54.1
9	13	Sergiy Khyzhnyak	Ukraine	47:29.4	+5:07.0
10	14	Aliaksandr Davidovich	Belarus	48:26.6	+6:04.2
11	9	Bruno Huber	Switzerland	50:01.2	+7:37.8
12	7	Vladimir Gajdiciar	Slovakia	50:24.9	+8:02.5
13	12	Romain Rosique	France	50:28.7	+8:06.3
14	5	Robert Wator	Poland	51:51.0	+9:28.6
15	10	Georges Bettega	France	51:51.7	+9:29.3
16	1	Ruslan Samchenko	Ukraine	51:59.5	+9:37.1
17	8	Kamil Rosiek	Poland	53:22.3	+10:59.9
18	11	Lou Gibson	Canada	53:38.8	+11:16.4
19	3	Hiroyuki Nagata	Japan	54:56.7	+12:34.3
20	2	Thierry Raoux	France	55:23.2	+13:00.8
21	4	Manfred Lehner	Austria	58:11.4	+15:49.0

== 12.5 km Standing ==
Rank	Bib	Name	Country	Time	Difference
1st place, gold medalist(s)	15	Nils-Erik Ulset	Norway	38:29.4	
2nd place, silver medalist(s)	16	Grygorii Vovchynskyi	Ukraine	39:28.5	+59.1
3rd place, bronze medalist(s)	13	Josef Giesen	Germany	41:25.0	+2:55.6
4	11	Kirill Mikhaylov	Russia	41:47.2	+3:17.8
5	10	Siarhei Silchanka	Belarus	41:51.8	+3:22.4
6	3	Oleh Leshchyshyn	Ukraine	42:18.8	+3:49.4
7	14	Yannick Bourseaux	France	42:34.7	+4:05.3
8	6	Vitalii Sytnyk	Ukraine	43:19.8	+4:50.4
9	17	Michael Kurz	Austria	44:35.8	+6:06.4
10	12	Thomas Oelsner	Germany	44:49.4	+6:20.0
11	2	Alfis Makamedinov	Russia	45:18.7	+6:49.3
12	8	Valery Darovskikh	Russia	46:05.1	+7:35.7
13	1	Vyacheslav Laykov	Russia	46:08.8	+7:39.4
14	5	Keiichi Sato	Japan	47:35.5	+9:06.1
15	4	Oleg Balukhto	Russia	49:02.8	+10:33.4
16	9	Mark Arendz	Canada	49:52.6	+11:23.2
17	7	Rushan Minnegulov	Russia	51:33.7	+13:04.3

== See also ==
- Biathlon at the 2010 Winter Olympics – Men's individual
