= 2011 IPC Biathlon and Cross-Country Skiing World Championships – Men's relay =

The Men's 1 x 4 + 2 x 5 kilometre relay in cross-country skiing was held on 9 April 2011. The relay was open for skiers in classification category visual impairment, sitting, and standing.

== Results ==
| Rank | Bib | Country | Athlete | Time (calculated) | Deficit |
|---|---|---|---|---|---|
| 1st place, gold medalist(s) | 11 | Russia | Sergey Shilov, Kirill Mikhaylov, Nikolay Polukhin, Guide: Andrey Tokarev | 42:11.7; 13:10.5; 15:39.4; 13:21.8 | |
| 2nd place, silver medalist(s) | 13 | Norway | Trygve Steinar Larsen, Vegard Dahle, Nils-Erik Ulset | 42:21.9; 10:59.5; 16:15.2; 15:07.2 | +10.2 |
| 3rd place, bronze medalist(s) | 12 | Ukraine | Iurii Kostiuk, Grygorii Vovchynskyi, Vitaliy Lukyanenko, Guide: Dmytro Khurtyk | 44:29.4; 13:13.1; 17:08.8; 14:07.5 | +2:17.7 |
| 4 | 14 | Belarus | Barys Pronka, Siarhei Silchanka, Vasili Shaptsiaboi, Guide: Mikalai Shablouski | 45:56.8; 12:50.8; 18:22.6; 14:43.4 | +3:45.1 |
| 5 | 15 | France | Romain Rosique, Thomas Clarion, Guide: Julien Bourla, Yannick Bourseaux | 48:48.1; 12:37.7; 19:52.9 16:17.5 | +6:36.4 |

== See also ==
- FIS Nordic World Ski Championships 2011 – Men's 4 × 10 kilometre relay
