= 2010 Winter Paralympics cross-country skiing men's 1 × 4 km and 2 × 5 km Relay =

Men's 1 × 4 km + 2 × 5 km Relay at the X Paralympic Winter Games
- Paralympic cross-country skiing
- Venue: Whistler Olympic Park
- Dates: March 20

The Men's 1 × 4 km + 2 × 5 km relay cross-country skiing competition of the Vancouver 2010 Paralympics was held at Whistler Olympic Park in Whistler, British Columbia. The competition was held on Thursday, March 20,.

It was the first time a Men's 1 × 4 km + 2 × 5 km Relay was held at the Paralympics, although a men's 1 × 3.75 km + 2 × 5 km relay had been held in Torino 2006, and a men's 1 × 2.5 km + 2 × 5 km relay in Salt Lake 2002.

Each team used three skiers with a disability. It was an open class event, open for standing, visually impaired and sitting classifications. An athlete with a visual impairment has a sighted guide (class B1, B2, optional for B3). Guides are an integral part of cross-country skiing for athletes with a visual impairment, and are medal contenders.

== Results ==
Rank	Bib	Country	Time	Difference
1st place, gold medalist(s)	2	Russia; Sergey Shilov; Kirill Mikhaylov; Nikolay Polukhin; Guide: Andrey Tokarev	38:54.8; 12:09.2; 13:48.3; 12:57.3	
2nd place, silver medalist(s)	3	Ukraine; Iurii Kostiuk; Grygorii Vovchinskyi; Vitaliy Lukyanenko; Guide: Volodymyr Ivanov	39:16.7; 11:34.5; 14:27.4; 13:14.8	+21.9
3rd place, bronze medalist(s)	1	Norway; Trygve Toskedal Larsen; Vegard Dahle; Nils-Erik Ulset	39:49.9; 10:39.7; 14:36.0; 14:34.2	+55.1
4	7	Belarus; Barys Pronka; Siarhei Silchanka; Vasili Shaptsiaboi; Guide: Mikalai Shablouski	41:20.1; 12:24.9; 15:33.8; 13:21.4	+2:25.3
5	6	Japan; Kozo Kubo; Yoshihiro Nitta; Keiichi Sato	41:48.8; 11:39.7; 14:49.8; 15:19.3	+2:54.0
6	4	France; Georges Bettega; Thomas Clarion; Guide: Tommy Terraz; Yannick Bourseaux	42:10.8; 11:27.1; 16:41.7 14:02.0	+3:16.0
7	8	Canada; Sebastien Fortier; Tyler Mosher; Mark Arendz	43:52.0; 12:04.7; 17:50.7; 13:56.6	+4:57.2
8	5	China; Fu Chunshan; Cheng Shishuai; Zou Dexin	44:06.6; 10:45.0; 17:27.6; 15:54.0	+5:11.8

== See also ==
- Cross-country skiing at the 2010 Winter Olympics – Men's 4 × 10 kilometre relay
