= 2010 Winter Paralympics national flag bearers =

During the Parade of Nations at the 2010 Winter Paralympics opening ceremony, which was held beginning at 6:00 PM PST on March 12, 2010, 44 athletes bore the flags of their respective nations and lead their national delegations as they paraded into BC Place Stadium in the host city of Vancouver, British Columbia, Canada.

The flag was borne by a sportsperson, from that country, chosen either by the National Paralympic Committee or by the athletes themselves to represent their country.

The following is a list of each country's flag bearer.

Order	Nation	Flag bearer	Sport
1	Andorra (AND)	Xabier Fernández	Alpine skiing
2	Argentina (ARG)	Juan Ignacio Maggi	Alpine skiing
3	Armenia (ARM)	Gayane Usnyan	Alpine skiing
4	Australia (AUS)	Toby Kane	Alpine skiing
5	Austria (AUT)	Robert Meusburger	Alpine skiing
6	Belarus (BLR)	Liudmila Vauchok	Cross-country skiing
7	Belgium (BEL)	Natasha De Troyer	Alpine skiing
8	Bosnia and Herzegovina (BIH)	Memic Nijaz	Alpine skiing
9	Bulgaria (BUL)	Aleksandar Stoyanov	Cross-country skiing
10	Chile (CHI)	Tomas De Villar	Alpine skiing
11	China (CHN)	Cheng Shishuai	Cross-country skiing
12	Croatia (CRO)	Maric Dadic	Alpine skiing
13	Czech Republic (CZE)	Anna Kuliskova	Alpine skiing
14	Denmark (DEN)	Marianne Maiboll	Cross-country skiing
15	Finland (FIN)	Ilkka Toumisto	Cross-country skiing
16	France (FRA)	Romain Riboud	Alpine skiing
17	Germany (GER)	Frank Höfle	Cross-country skiing
18	Great Britain (GBR)	Michael McCreadie	Wheelchair curling
19	Greece (GRE)	Vivi Christodoulopoulou	Alpine skiing
20	Hungary (HUN)	Balazs Koleszar	Alpine skiing
21	Iceland (ISL)	Erna Fridriksdottir	Alpine skiing
22	Iran (IRI)	Sadegh Kalhor	Alpine skiing
23	Italy (ITA)	Gianmaria Dal Maistro	Alpine skiing
24	Japan (JPN)	Takayuki Endo	Ice sledge hockey
25	Kazakhstan (KAZ)	Oleg Syssolyatin	Cross-country skiing
26	Mexico (MEX)	Juan Armando Ruiz Hernandez	Alpine skiing
27	Mongolia (MGL)	Enkhbaatar Zorig	Cross-country skiing
28	Netherlands (NED)	Falco Jeitsma	Alpine skiing coach
29	New Zealand (NZL)	Adam Hall	Alpine skiing
30	Norway (NOR)	Mariann Vestbostad	Cross-country skiing
31	Poland (POL)	Jarosław Rola	Alpine skiing
32	Romania (ROU)	Laura Valenu	Alpine skiing
33	Russia (RUS)	Valery Kupchinskii	Cross-country skiing
34	Serbia (SRB)	Jasmin Bambur	Alpine skiing
35	Slovakia (SVK)	Ivaeta Chlebakova	Alpine skiing
36	Slovenia (SLO)	Gal Jakic	Alpine skiing
37	South Africa (RSA)	David Bruce Warner	Alpine skiing
38	South Korea (KOR)	Han Min-su	Ice sledge hockey
39	Spain (ESP)	Ursula Pueyo	Alpine skiing
40	Sweden (SWE)	Jens Kask	Ice sledge hockey
41	Switzerland (SUI)	Thomas Pfyl	Alpine skiing
42	Ukraine (UKR)	Olena Iurkovska	Cross-country skiing
43	United States (USA)	Heath Calhoun	Alpine skiing
44	Canada (CAN)	Jean Labonté	Ice sledge hockey

== See also ==
- 2010 Winter Olympics national flag bearers
