= Zebastian Modin =

Swedish Para cross-country skier and biathlete (born 1994)

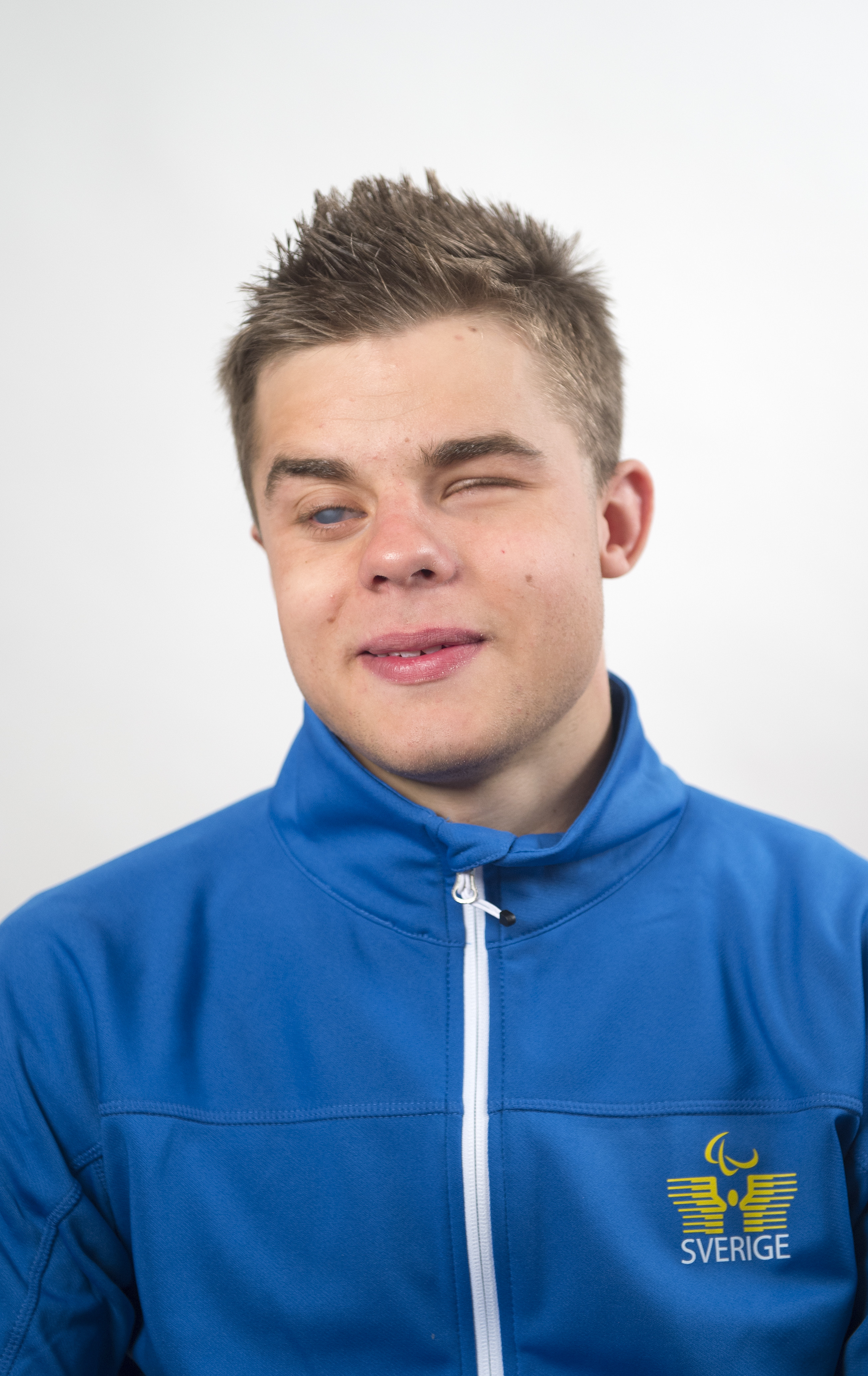
- Zebastian Modin, 2013

Personal information
- Full name: Zebastian Tintin Modin
- Born: 20 June 1994 (age 32) Sweden
- Home town: Östersund, Sweden

Sport
- Country: Sweden
- Sport: Para Nordic skiing (Para cross-country skiing and Para biathlon)
- Disability: Visually impaired
- Disability class: NS1
- Club: Östersunds SK; Biathlon Östersund; Synskadades IF Träffen
Medal record
Men's Para cross-country skiing
Representing Sweden
Paralympic Games
| Silver medal – second place | 2014 Sochi | 4 × 2.5 km mixed relay |
| Silver medal – second place | 2014 Sochi | 1 km freestyle sprint |
| Silver medal – second place | 2018 Pyeongchang | 1.5km sprint classical |
| Silver medal – second place | 2022 Beijing | 12.5km freestyle |
| Bronze medal – third place | 2010 Vancouver | 1 km classical sprint |
| Bronze medal – third place | 2014 Sochi | 20 km classical |
| Bronze medal – third place | 2022 Beijing | 20 km classical |
| Bronze medal – third place | 2022 Beijing | 1.5 km freestyle sprint |
| Bronze medal – third place | 2026 Milano Cortina | 1 km classical sprint |
| Bronze medal – third place | 2026 Milano Cortina | 10 km classical |

Zebastian Tintin Modin (born 20 June 1994) is a Swedish Para cross-country skier and biathlete. He competes in classification NS1 (visual impairment) events.

== Career ==
He competed in biathlon and cross-country skiing at the 2010, 2014 and the 2018 Winter Paralympics, winning four medals. His first medal was the bronze medal at the men's 1 km sprint, visually impaired. His sighted guide at the 2010 and 2014 Paralympic Games was Albin Ackerot. At the 2018 Winter Paralympics his sighted guides were Johannes Andersson and Robin Bryntesson.

Zebastian Modin came in 9th place at the men's 10 km and 11th at the men's 20 km, visually impaired.

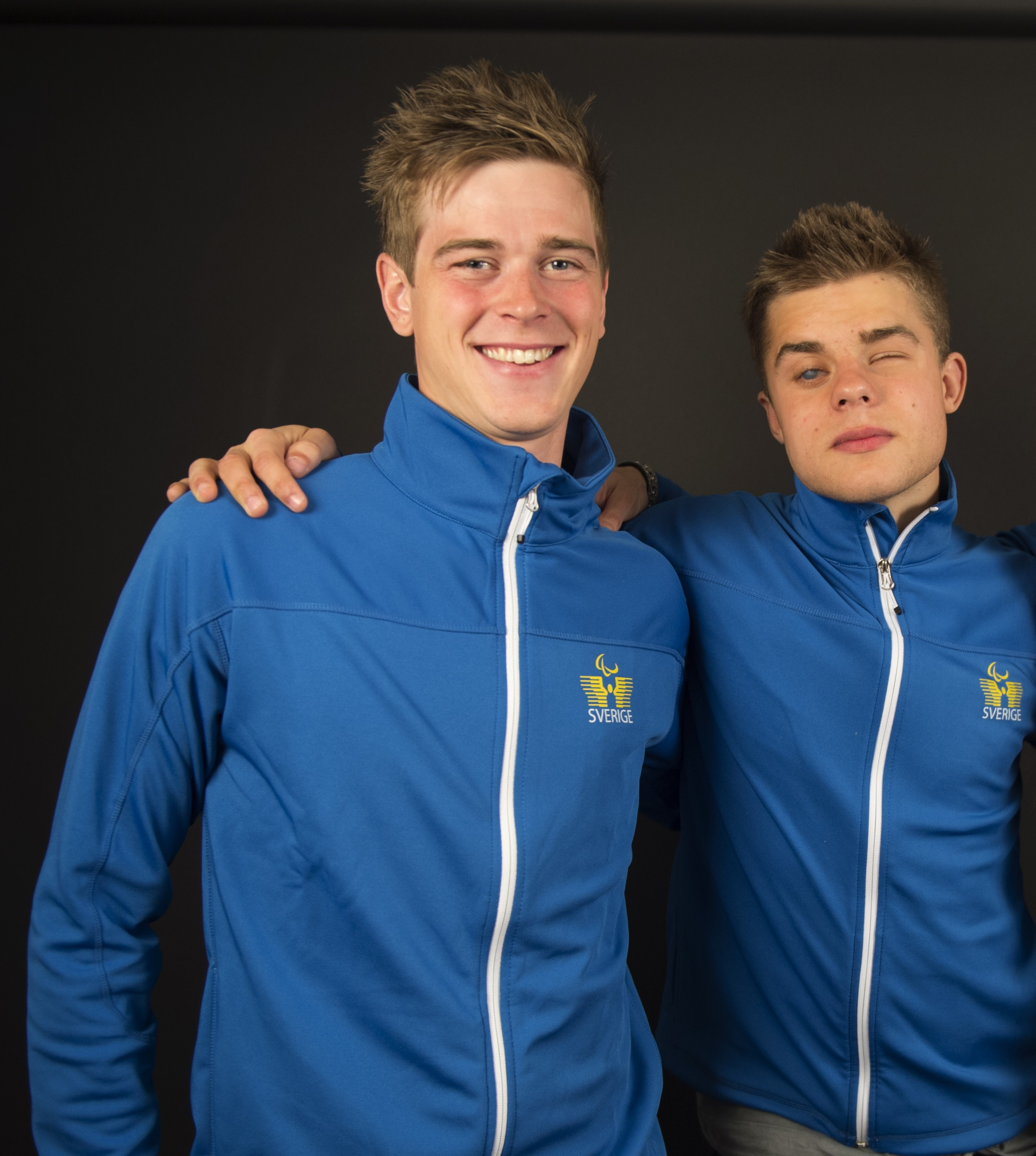
Modin with his sighted guide - Albin Ackerot

.
