= Ukraine at the 2010 Winter Paralympics =

- IPC code: UKR
- NPC: National Sports Committee for the Disabled of Ukraine
- Website: www.paralympic.org.ua

in Vancouver
- Competitors: 19 in 3 sports
- Flag bearer: Olena Iurkovska
- Medals Ranked 4th: Gold 5 Silver 8 Bronze 6 Total 19

Winter Paralympics appearances (overview)
- 1998; 2002; 2006; 2010; 2014; 2018; 2022; 2026

Other related appearances
- Soviet Union (1988); Unified Team (1992)

Ukraine sent a delegation to compete at the 2010 Winter Paralympics in Vancouver, British Columbia, Canada. The country fielded a total of nineteen athletes (eleven men and eight women) in three of the Games' five sports: alpine skiing, biathlon and cross-country skiing.

== Medalists ==
Medal	Name	Sport	Event
Gold	Olena Iurkovska	Biathlon	Women's 2.4 km sitting
Gold	Oleksandra Kononova	Cross-Country Skiing	Women's 5 km standing
Gold	Oleksandra Kononova	Biathlon	Women's 12.5 km standing
Gold	Oleksandra Kononova	Cross-country skiing	Women's 1 km standing
Gold	Vitaliy Lukyanenko	Biathlon	Men's 3 km visually impaired
Silver	Iurii Kostiuk	Biathlon	Men's 2.4 km sitting
Silver	Iurii Kostiuk, Grygorii Vovchynskyi, Vitaliy Lukyanenko	Cross-country skiing	Men's 1x4 +2x5 km relay
Silver	Olena Iurkovska, Iuliia Batenkova, Oleksandra Kononova	Cross-country skiing	Women's 3x2.5 km relay
Silver	Iuliia Batenkova	Cross-country skiing	Women's 15 km standing
Silver	Iuliia Batenkova	Cross-country skiing	Women's 5 km standing
Silver	Grygorii Vovchynskyi	Biathlon	Men's 12.5 km standing
Silver	Olena Iurkovska	Biathlon	Women's 10 km sitting
Bronze	Iuliia Batenkova	Biathlon	Women's 12.5 km standing
Bronze	Lyudmyla Pavlenko	Biathlon	Women's 2.4 km sitting
Bronze	Grygorii Vovchynskyi	Cross-country skiing	Men's 10km standing
Bronze	Vitaliy Lukyanenko	Biathlon	Men's 12.5 km, visually impaired
Bronze	Olena Iurkovska	Cross-country skiing	Women's 10 km sitting
Bronze	Grygorii Vovchynskyi	Biathlon	Men's 3km pursuit

== See also ==
- 2010 Winter Paralympics
- Ukraine at the 2010 Winter Olympics
