= Volodymyr Ivanov (skier) =

Ukrainian skier

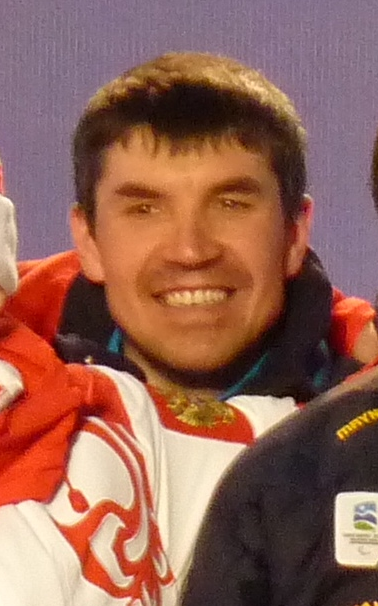

Personal information
- Born: Ukraine

Sport
- Sport: Skiing
Medal record
Representing Ukraine
Paralympic Games
Men's para cross-country skiing
Silver medal – second place	2010 Vancouver	1x4/2x5 km relay
Bronze medal – third place	2006 Torino	1x3.75/2x5 km relay
Bronze medal – third place	2002 Salt Lake	5 km Classical Technique, B3
Men's para biathlon
Gold medal – first place	2006 Torino	12.5 km, blind
Silver medal – second place	2006 Torino	7.5 km, blind
Silver medal – second place	2010 Vancouver	12.5 km, visually impaired
Bronze medal – third place	2010 Vancouver	3 km pursuit, visually impaired

Volodymyr Ivanov is a Ukrainian biathlete, cross-country skier, sighted guide, and Paralympian.

He has competed at three Paralympic Games as the sighted guide for Vitaliy Lukyanenko.

== Career ==
At the 2002 Winter Paralympics he competed in cross-country skiing and biathlon as the sighted guide for Vitaliy Lukyanenko. In cross-country skiing, they took the bronze medal in the 5 km classical technique, B3. They placed 16th in the 20 km free technique, 4th in the 10 km free technique, B3, and 5th in the men's relay. In biathlon, they placed 11th in the 7.5 km free technique, blind.

He competed as the sighted guide for Lukyanenko in biathlon and cross-country skiing at the 2006 Winter Paralympics. In cross-country skiing he took the bronze in the men's relay with Lukyanenko, Vladyslav Morozov, and Oleh Munts. He placed 7th in the men's 5 km, visually impaired. In biathlon, he took the gold medal in 12.5 km, and silver in 7.5 km, blind.

He competed in biathlon and cross-country skiing at the 2010 Winter Paralympics in Vancouver, Canada as the sighted guide for Lukyanenko. In cross-country skiing he won silver in the men's relay, open with Lukyanenko, Grygorii Vovchynskyi, and Iurii Kostiuk. He placed 5th in the men's 1 km sprint, visually impaired. In biathlon, he took the bronze medal in the 12.5 km, and the gold medal in the men's 3 km pursuit, visually impaired.
