= China at the 2010 Winter Paralympics =

- IPC code: CHN
- NPC: China Administration of Sports for Persons with Disabilities
- Website: www.caspd.org.cn

in Vancouver
- Competitors: 7 in 1 sport
- Flag bearer: Cheng Shishuai
- Medals: Gold 0 Silver 0 Bronze 0 Total 0

Winter Paralympics appearances (overview)
- 2002; 2006; 2010; 2014; 2018; 2022; 2026

China sent 7 competitors to compete in one discipline at the 2010 Winter Paralympics in Vancouver, British Columbia, Canada.

== Cross-country skiing ==
Women

Athlete	Event	Qualification			Semifinal		Final		
Athlete	Event	Real Time	Calculated Time	Rank	Result	Rank	Real Time	Calculated Time	Rank
Geng Zhaojing	1 km sprint classic, standing		6:35.25	18	did not qualify				18
Geng Zhaojing	5km classic, standing						did not finish		
Peng Yuanyuan	1 km sprint classic, standing		4:31.38	8	4:47.1	4	did not advance		8
Peng Yuanyuan	5km classic, standing						19:31.5	17:57.8	5
Peng Yuanyuan	15km free, standing						57:26.7	55:43.3	7

Men

Athlete	Event	Qualification			Semifinal		Final		
Athlete	Event	Real Time	Calculated Time	Rank	Result	Rank	Real Time	Calculated Time	Rank
Cheung Shishuai	1 km sprint classic, standing		3:45.88	19	did not qualify				19
Cheung Shishuai	10km classic, standing						disqualified		
Cheung Shishuai	20km free, standing						1:02:21.8	59:52.1	16
Cheung Shishuai	1x4 km + 2x5 km Relay						44:06.6		8
Du Haitao	1 km sprint classic, standing		3:52.27	25	did not qualify				25
Du Haitao	10km classic, standing						40:26.8	31:57.2	19
Du Haitao	20km free, standing						1:03:47.5	55:29.9	7
Fu Chunshan	1 km sprint classic, sitting		2:20.69	14	did not qualify				14
Fu Chunshan	10km classic, sitting						29:02.6	29:02.6	10
Fu Chunshan	15km free, sitting						44:19.1	44:19.1	14
Fu Chunshan	1x4 km + 2x5 km Relay						44:06.6		8
Li Bo	1 km sprint classic, standing		4:54.00	29	did not qualify				29
Li Bo	10km classic, standing						did not finish		
Zou Dexin	1 km sprint classic, standing		3:55.83	27	did not qualify				27
Zou Dexin	10km classic, standing						34:00.5	30:56.9	15
Zou Dexin	1x4 km + 2x5 km Relay						44:06.6		8

== See also ==
- China at the 2010 Winter Olympics
