= Vladimir Kononov (skier) =

Russian cross-country skier

Personal information
- Born: 16 February 1972 (age 54) Russia

Sport
- Sport: Skiing
Medal record
Representing Russia
Men's cross-country skiing
Paralympic Games
Bronze medal – third place	2010 Vancouver	20 km, standing

Vladimir Kononov (born 16 February 1972) is a Russian cross-country skier and Paralympian. He competes in classification category standing events, and is classified LW5/7 (double arm amputation).

He competed in cross-country skiing at the 2010 Winter Paralympics, where he took the bronze medal in the men's 20 km, standing. He placed 12th in the men's 1 km sprint, and 13th in the men's 10 km, standing.
