= Vitaliy Lukyanenko =

Ukrainian Paralympic competitor

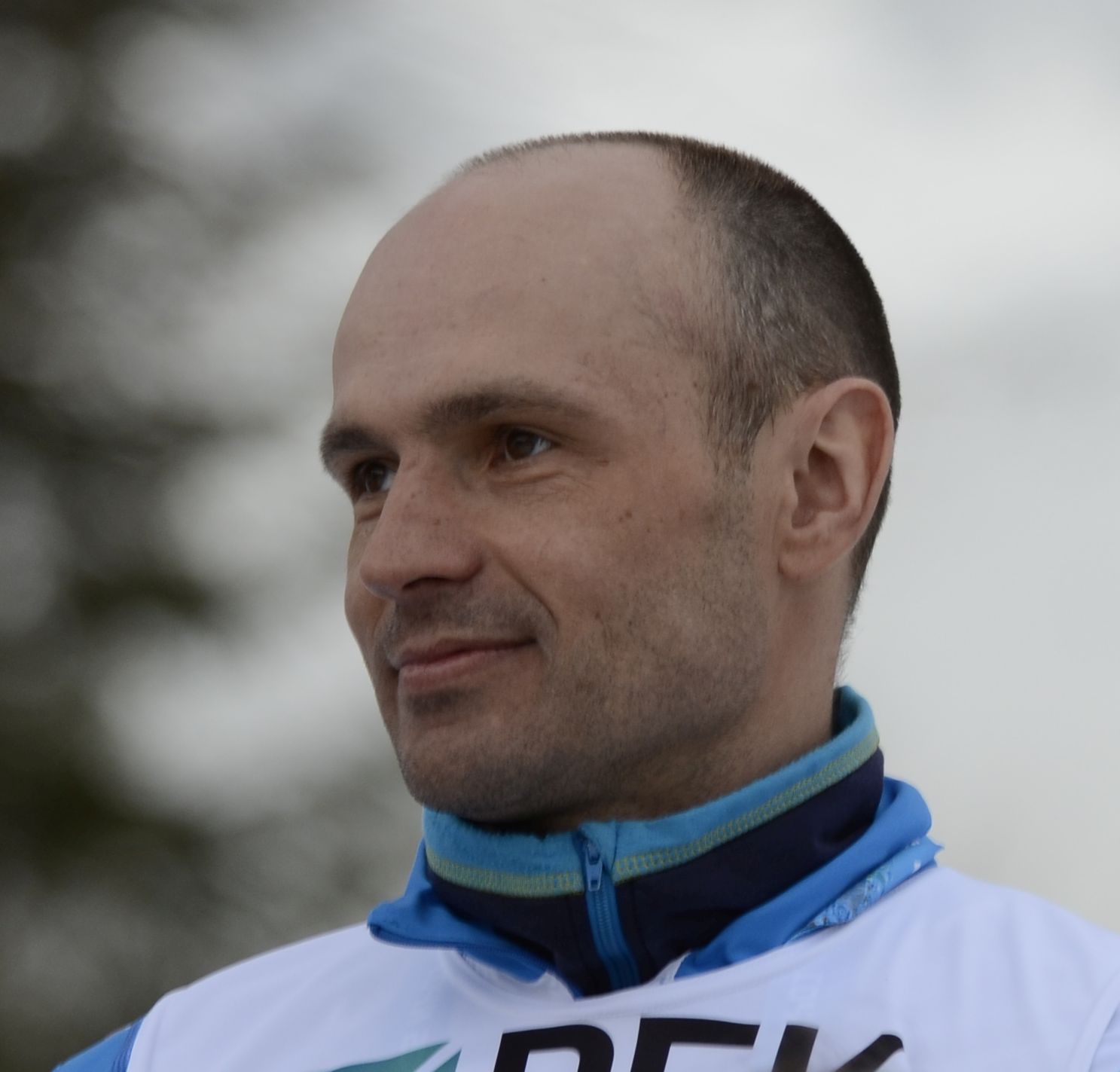

Personal information
- Full name: Vitaliy Volodymyrovych Lukyanenko
- Born: 15 May 1978 (age 48) Sumy, Ukrainian SSR, Soviet Union

Sport
- Sport: Skiing
Medal record
Representing Ukraine
Paralympic Games
Men's para cross-country skiing
Silver medal – second place	2010 Vancouver	1x4/2x5 km relay
Silver medal – second place	2014 Sochi	4x2.5 km open relay
Bronze medal – third place	2006 Torino	1x3.75/2x5 km relay
Bronze medal – third place	2002 Salt Lake	5 km Classical Technique, B3
Men's para biathlon
Gold medal – first place	2006 Torino	12.5 km, blind
Gold medal – first place	2010 Vancouver	3 km pursuit, visually impaired
Gold medal – first place	2014 Sochi	7.5 km, visually impaired
Gold medal – first place	2014 Sochi	12.5 km, visually impaired
Gold medal – first place	2018 Pyeongchang	7.5km, visually impaired
Gold medal – first place	2018 Pyeongchang	15km visually impaired
Gold medal – first place	2022 Beijing	6km, visually impaired
Gold medal – first place	2022 Beijing	10km, visually impaired
Silver medal – second place	2006 Torino	7.5 km, blind
Silver medal – second place	2022 Beijing	12.5km visually impaired
Bronze medal – third place	2010 Vancouver	12.5 km, visually impaired
World Championships
Men's para cross-country skiing
Bronze medal – third place	2005 Fort Kent	1x3.5/2x5 km relay
Bronze medal – third place	2009 Vuokatti	1x4/2x5 km relay
Bronze medal – third place	2011 Khanty-Mansiysk	1x4/2x5 km relay
Men's para biathlon
Gold medal – first place	2019 Prince George	15 km, visually impaired
Silver medal – second place	2009 Vuokatti	3.6 km pursuit, visually impaired
Silver medal – second place	2013 Sollefteå	12.5 km, visually impaired
Silver medal – second place	2013 Sollefteå	15 km, visually impaired
Silver medal – second place	2019 Prince George	12.5 km, visually impaired
Bronze medal – third place	2009 Vuokatti	12.5 km, visually impaired
Bronze medal – third place	2017 Finsterau	15 km, visually impaired

Vitaliy Volodymyrovych Lukyanenko (Ukrainian: Віталій Володимирович Лук'яненко, born 15 May 1978) is a Ukrainian biathlete, cross-country skier, and Paralympian.

He is classified B3 (under 10% functional vision), and competes in the visually impaired category.

He competed at the 2022 Winter Paralympics, winning a gold medal in the men's 6 kilometres and 10 kilometres biathlon events.

== Career ==
Lukyanenko began skiing at age ten.

At the 2002 Winter Paralympics he competed in cross-country skiing and biathlon. In cross-country skiing, he took the bronze medal in the 5 km classical technique, B3. He placed 16th in the 20 km free technique, 4th in the 10 km free technique, B3, and 5th in the men's relay. In biathlon, he placed 11th in the 7.5 km free technique, blind.

Lukyanenko competed in biathlon and cross-country skiing at the 2006 Winter Paralympics. In cross-country skiing he took the bronze in the men's relay with Volodymyr Ivanov, Vladyslav Morozov, and Oleh Munts. He placed 7th in the men's 5 km, visually impaired. In biathlon, he took the gold medal in 12.5 km, and silver in 7.5 km, blind.

Lukyanenko competed in biathlon and cross-country skiing at the 2010 Winter Paralympics in Vancouver, Canada. In cross-country skiing he won silver in the men's relay, open with Ivanov, Grygorii Vovchynskyi, and Iurii Kostiuk. He placed 5th in the men's 1 km sprint, visually impaired. In biathlon, he took the bronze medal in the 12.5 km, and the gold medal in the men's 3 km pursuit, visually impaired. His guide at the 2002, 2006, and 2010 Paralympics was Volodymyr Ivanov.

In biathlon, he won the gold medals in the men's 6 km and 10 kilometres visually impaired events, and a silver medal in the 12.5 kilometres visually impaired event at the 2022 Winter Paralympics held in Beijing, China.

== Personal life ==
Lukyanenko was born in Sumy. He has two daughters.
