= Biathlon at the 2010 Winter Paralympics =

Biathlon at the X Paralympic Winter Games
- Venue: Whistler Paralympic Park
- Dates: March 13; March 17

The biathlon competition of the Vancouver 2010 Paralympics was held at Whistler, British Columbia. The events were held on 13 March and 17 March 2010.

== Medal table ==
Rank	Nation	Gold	Silver	Bronze	Total
1	Russia (RUS)	5	7	4	16
2	Ukraine (UKR)	3	3	4	10
3	Germany (GER)	3	0	2	5
4	Norway (NOR)	1	1	0	2
5	Finland (FIN)	0	1	0	1
6	Belarus (BLR)	0	0	1	1
6	United States (USA)	0	0	1	1
Totals (7 entries)		12	12	12	36

== Events ==
The program includes a total of 12 events, 6 for men and 6 for women. Competitors are divided into three categories: standing, visually impaired, and sitting. Standing biathletes are those that have a locomotive disability but are able to use the same equipment as able-bodied skiers, while sitting competitors use a sitski. Skiers with a visual impairment compete with the help of a sighted guide and an acoustic aiming system. The skier with the visual impairment and the guide are considered a team, and dual medals are awarded.

Men

- 3 km×2 pursuit
  - Standing
  - Visually impaired
  - Sitting
- 12.5 km individual
  - Standing
  - Visually impaired
  - Sitting

Women

- 3 km×2 pursuit
  - Standing
  - Visually impaired
  - Sitting
- 12.5 km individual
  - Standing
  - Visually impaired
- 10 km individual
  - Sitting

=== Women's events ===
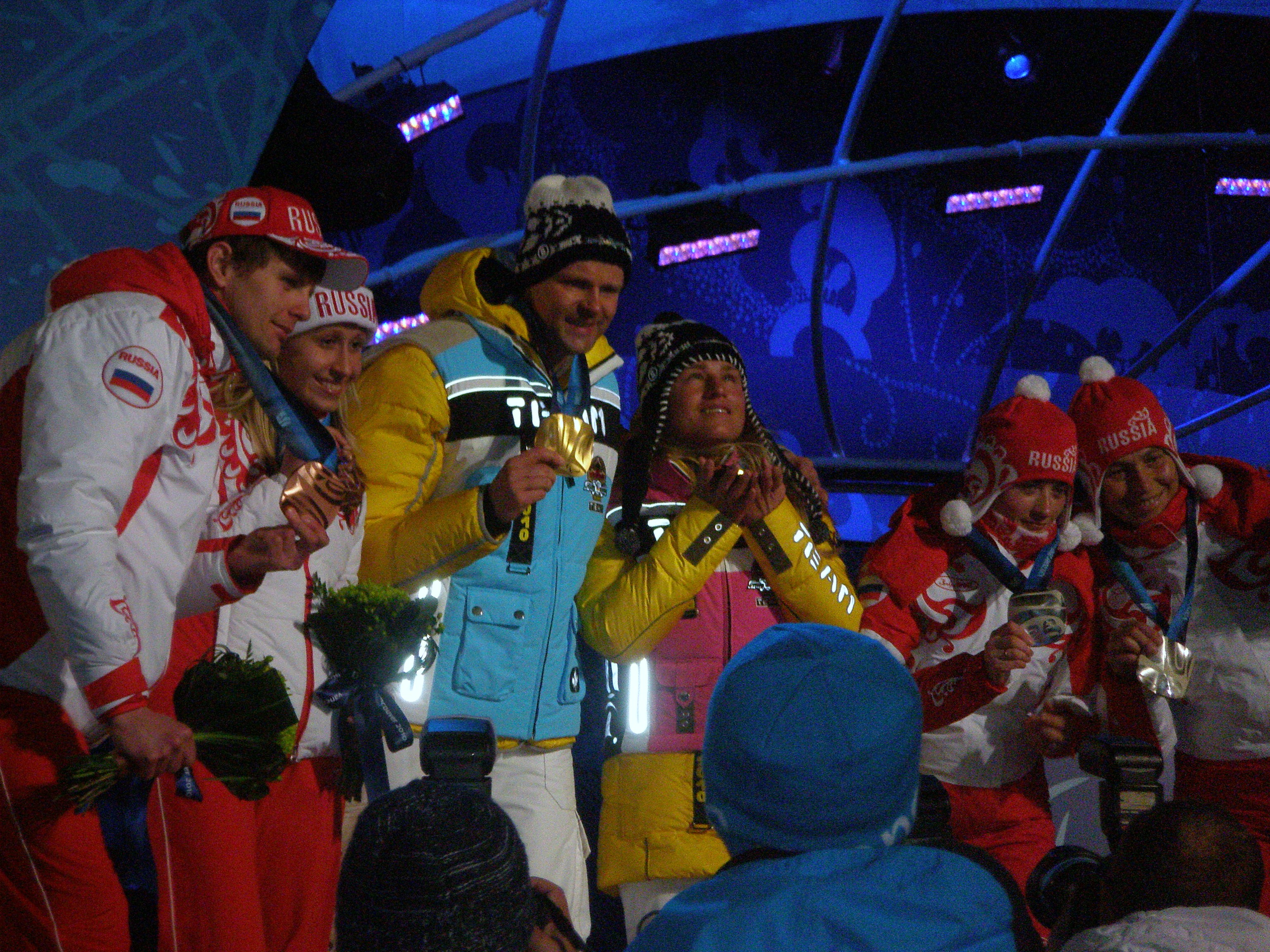
Pursuit & Individual - visually impaired. From left to right: Bronze medalists Alexey Ivanov (guide) and Mikhalina Lysova of Russia, gold medalists Thomas Friedrich (guide) and Verena Bentele of Germany, and silver medalists Natalia Yakimova (guide) and Lioubov Vasilieva of Russia.

Event	Class	Gold		Silver		Bronze	
Pursuit	visually impaired	Verena Bentele; Guide: Thomas Friedrich; Germany	12:51.8	Lioubov Vasilieva; Guide: Natalia Yakimova; Russia	13:23.4	Mikhalina Lysova; Guide: Alexey Ivanov; Russia	13:40.8
Pursuit	sitting	Olena Iurkovska; Ukraine	09:55.5	Maria Iovleva; Russia	10:12.6	Lyudmyla Pavlenko; Ukraine	10:20.7
Pursuit	standing	Anna Burmistrova; Russia	11:24.1	Maija Loytynoja; Finland	12:59.8	Alena Gorbunova; Russia	13:25.1
Individual	visually impaired	Verena Bentele; Guide: Thomas Friedrich; Germany	43:57.3	Lioubov Vasilieva; Guide: Natalia Yakimova; Russia	46:59.4	Mikhalina Lysova; Guide: Alexey Ivanov; Russia	47:59.1
Individual	sitting	Maria Iovleva; Russia	38:46.6	Olena Iurkovska; Ukraine	39:07.8	Andrea Eskau; Germany	39:54.2
Individual	standing	Oleksandra Kononova; Ukraine	46:01.4	Anna Burmistrova; Russia	48:04.0	Iuliia Batenkova; Ukraine	48:22.5

=== Men's events ===
Event	Class	Gold		Silver		Bronze	
Pursuit	visually impaired	Vitaliy Lukyanenko; Guide: Volodymyr Ivanov; Ukraine	10:54.3	Nikolay Polukhin; Guide: Andrey Tokarev; Russia	11:09.2	Vasili Shaptsiaboi; Guide: Mikalai Shablouski; Belarus	11:16.0
Pursuit	sitting	Irek Zaripov; Russia	09:51.0	Iurii Kostiuk; Ukraine	10:38.9	Andy Soule; United States	10:53.1
Pursuit	standing	Kirill Mikhaylov; Russia	10:32.2	Nils-Erik Ulset; Norway	10:51.3	Grygorii Vovchinskiy; Ukraine	10:58.9
Individual	visually impaired	Wilhelm Brem; Guide: Florian Grimm; Germany	38:28.6	Nikolay Polukhin; Guide: Andrey Tokarev; Russia	38:32.7	Vitaliy Lukyanenko; Guide: Volodymyr Ivanov; Ukraine	38:55.5
Individual	sitting	Irek Zaripov; Russia	42:22.4	Vladimir Kiselev; Russia	42:29.9	Roman Petushkov; Russia	43:11.0
Individual	standing	Nils-Erik Ulset; Norway	38:29.4	Grygorii Vovchinskiy; Ukraine	39:28.5	Josef Giesen; Germany	41:25.0

== See also ==
- Biathlon at the 2010 Winter Olympics
