= Alain Marguerettaz =

French Paralympian (born 1962)

Alain Marguerettaz (born 31 August 1962) is a French Paralympian who started in alpine skiing. His first Paralympics was in 1992 and he received a bronze medal in giant slalom LWXII at the 1994 Paralympics. He would later switch to Nordic events and received a bronze in the 2006 Winter Paralympics for cross-country skiing in the 5 km sitting event. He will represent France again in cross-country skiing at the 2010 Winter Paralympics in Vancouver.
