= Kirill Mikhaylov =

Russian cross-country skier

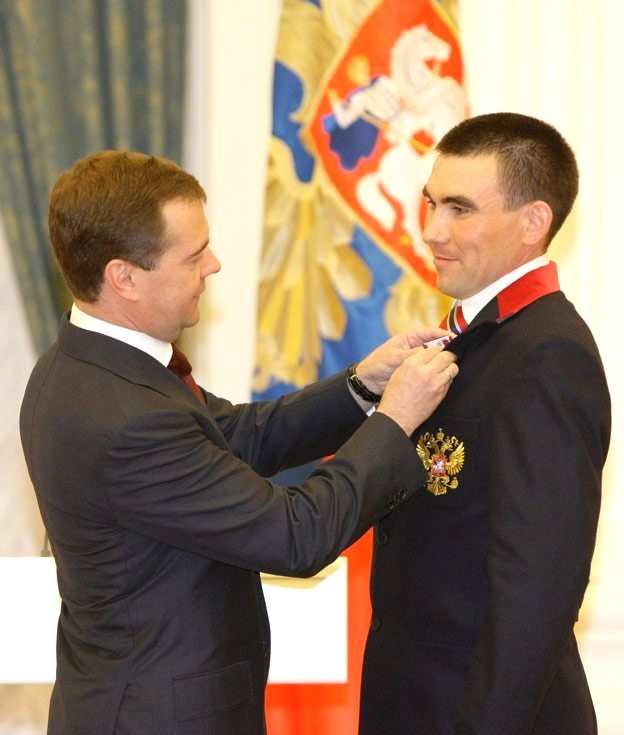
- Kirill Mikhaylov is awarded the Order for Services to the Fatherland, fourth degree, in Russia, by President Dmitry Medvedev, for winning three gold and two silver in biathlon and cross-country skiing at the 2010 Winter Paralympics.

Personal information
- Born: 2 April 1983 (age 43) Russia

Sport
- Sport: Skiing
Medal record
Representing Russia
Paralympic Games
Men's para cross-country skiing
Gold medal – first place	2010 Vancouver	1x4/2x5 km relay
Gold medal – first place	2010 Vancouver	20 km, standing
Gold medal – first place	2006 Torino	20 km, standing
Silver medal – second place	2010 Vancouver	1 km sprint, standing
Silver medal – second place	2010 Vancouver	10 km, standing
Bronze medal – third place	2006 Torino	10 km, standing
Men's para biathlon
Gold medal – first place	2010 Vancouver	3 km pursuit, standing

Kirill Mikhaylov (born 2 April 1983) is a Russian cross-country skier, biathlete, and four-time Paralympic Champion. He competed in the classification category, standing events.

Mikhaylov competed in cross-country skiing at the 2006 Winter Paralympics. He took the gold in the men's 20 km and the bronze in the men's 10 km, standing. He placed 5th in the men's relay with Alfis Makamedinov and Vladimir Kiselev and 4th in the men's 5 km, standing.

Mikhaylov competed at the 2010 Winter Paralympics in cross-country skiing and biathlon. In cross-country skiing, he took the gold in the men's 1x4/2x5 km relay together with Sergey Shilov, Nikolay Polukhin, and guide Andrey Tokarev, and in the 20 km, standing. He took the silver in the 1 km sprint and the 10 km, standing. In biathlon, he took the gold medal in the men's 3 km pursuit, standing. He placed 4th in the 12.5 km individual standing.
