= Nils-Erik Ulset =

Norwegian Paralympic competitor (born 1983)

Nils Erik Ulset
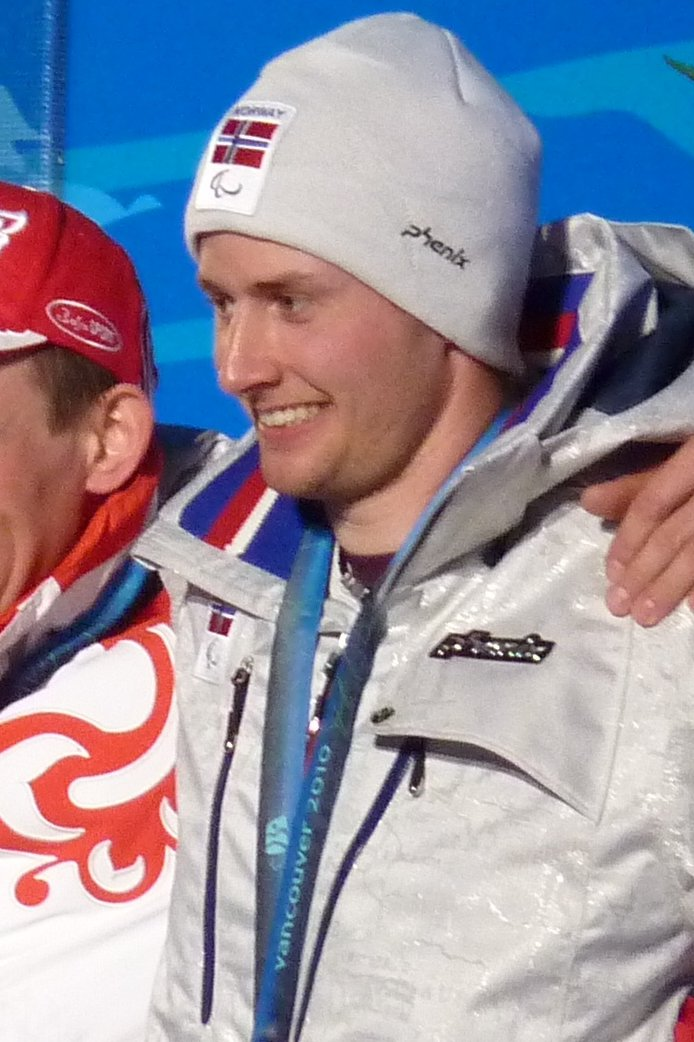
- Ulset in 2010

Personal information
- Nickname: Nikkis
- Born: 16 July 1983 (age 42) Tingvoll Municipality, Norway

Sport
- Sport: Biathlon, cross-country skiing
Medal record
Representing Norway
Paralympic Games
Men's para biathlon
| Gold medal – first place | 2010 Vancouver | 12.5 km, standing |
| Silver medal – second place | 2010 Vancouver | 3km pursuit, standing |
| Bronze medal – third place | 2006 Turin | 12.5 km, standing |
| Bronze medal – third place | 2006 Turin | 7.5 km, standing |
| Bronze medal – third place | 2018 Pyeongchang | 15km standing |
Men's para cross-country skiing
| Gold medal – first place | 2002 Salt Lake | 10 km, LW2-4 |
| Gold medal – first place | 2002 Salt Lake | 20 km, standing |
| Silver medal – second place | 2010 Vancouver | 20 km, standing |
| Silver medal – second place | 2018 Pyeongchang | 4 x 2.5km relay open |
| Bronze medal – third place | 2010 Vancouver | men's relay |

Nils Erik Ulset (born 16 July 1983 in Tingvoll Municipality) is a Norwegian biathlete, cross-country skier, and three-time Paralympic champion.

== Biography ==
He competed at the 2002 Winter Paralympics in Salt Lake, where he took two gold medals in cross-country skiing, one in 10 km, LW2-4 and one in 20 km, standing. In biathlon he placed 7th in the 7.5 km, standing.

At the 2006 Winter Paralympics in Torino, he took two bronze medals in biathlon: The 12.5 km and 7.5 km, standing. In cross-country skiing he placed 9th in the men's 10 km, 14th in the 20 km and 9th in the 5 km, standing.

He won silver at the 2010 Winter Paralympics in Vancouver, for 3km pursuit standing biathlon. He won gold at the 12.5 km standing biathlon. In cross-country skiing he took the silver medal in the men's 20 km, standing and bronze in the men's relay.
