= Iurii Kostiuk =

Ukrainian biathlete (born 1977)

Personal information
- Full name: Iurii Illich Kostiuk or Yuriy Illich Kostyuk (see Romanization of Ukrainian)
- Born: 2 October 1977 (age 48) Lutsk, Ukrainian SSR, Soviet Union

Sport
- Sport: Skiing
Medal record
Representing Ukraine
Paralympic Games
Men's para cross-country skiing
Gold medal – first place	2006 Torino	15 km, sitski
Silver medal – second place	2006 Torino	5 km, sitski
Silver medal – second place	2010 Vancouver	1x4/2x5 km relay
Bronze medal – third place	2006 Torino	10 km, sitski
Men's para biathlon
Silver medal – second place	2006 Torino	7.5 km, sitski
Silver medal – second place	2010 Vancouver	2.4 km pursuit, sitting
World Championships
Men's para cross-country skiing
Silver medal – second place	2003 Mitteltal-Obertal	15 km, sitski
Silver medal – second place	2005 Fort Kent	10 km, sitski
Bronze medal – third place	2003 Mitteltal-Obertal	10 km, sitski
Bronze medal – third place	2005 Fort Kent	15 km, sitski
Bronze medal – third place	2009 Vuokatti	1x4/2x5 km relay
Bronze medal – third place	2011 Khanty-Mansiysk	1x4/2x5 km relay
Men's para biathlon
Bronze medal – third place	2009 Vuokatti	3 km pursuit, sitting

Iurii Illich Kostiuk (Ukrainian: Юрій Ілліч Костюк, born 2 October 1977) is a Ukrainian biathlete, cross-country skier, and Paralympic Champion.

== Career ==
He competed in biathlon and cross-country skiing at the 2006 Winter Paralympics in Turin, Italy. In cross-country skiing he took the gold medal in the men's 15 km, silver in the 5 km and bronze in the 10 km, sitski. In biathlon, he took the silver medal in the men's 7.5 km and placed 4th in the 12.5 km.

At the 2010 Winter Paralympics in Vancouver, Canada, he took one silver medal in biathlon in the men's 2.4 km pursuit, sitting, and one in cross-country skiing in the men's relay, open. In biathlon, he also competed in the 12.5 km individual, sitting where he placed 5th, and in cross-country skiing where he placed 4th in the men's 1 km sprint, 4th in the 10 km and 5th in the 15 km, sitting.
