= Norway at the 2010 Winter Paralympics =

- IPC code: NOR
- NPC: Norwegian Olympic and Paralympic Committee and Confederation of Sports
- Website: www.idrett.no (in Norwegian)

in Vancouver
- Competitors: 27 in 4 sports
- Flag bearer: Mariann Vestbostad
- Medals Ranked 12th: Gold 1 Silver 3 Bronze 2 Total 6

Winter Paralympics appearances (overview)
- 1976; 1980; 1984; 1988; 1992; 1994; 1998; 2002; 2006; 2010; 2014; 2018; 2022; 2026

Norway sent a delegation to compete at the 2010 Winter Paralympics in Vancouver, British Columbia, Canada. A total of 27 Norwegian athletes competed in four disciplines; the only sport Norway did not compete in is alpine skiing.

== Biathlon ==
Athlete	Events	Factor %	Qualification			Final		
Athlete	Events	Factor %	Missed shots	Finish time	Rank	Missed shots	Finish time	Rank
Trygve Steinar Toskedal Larsen	Men's Pursuit - Sitting			10:18.47	17			17
Nils-Erik Ulset	Men's Pursuit - Standing			9:19.44	3 Q		10:51.3	2nd place, silver medalist(s)
Nils-Erik Ulset	Men's 12.5 km - Standing							1st place, gold medalist(s)

== Cross-country skiing ==
Women

Athlete	Event	Final	
Athlete	Event	Time	Rank
Mariann Vestbøstad Marthinsen	10 km - Sitting	33:27.8	5

Men

Athlete	Event	Final	
Athlete	Event	Time	Rank
Per Fagerhøi	15 km - Sitting	46:23.00	25
Trygve Steinar Toskedal Larsen	15 km - Sitting	42:17.03	4
Kjartan Nesbakken Haugen			
Helge Flo	20 km - Visually Impaired	54:22.7	8
Vegard Dahle	20 km - Standing	55:42.9	8
Svein Lilleberg	20 km - Standing	1:06:33.0	19
Nils-Erik Ulset	20 km - Standing	53:34.1	2nd place, silver medalist(s)

== Ice sledge hockey ==
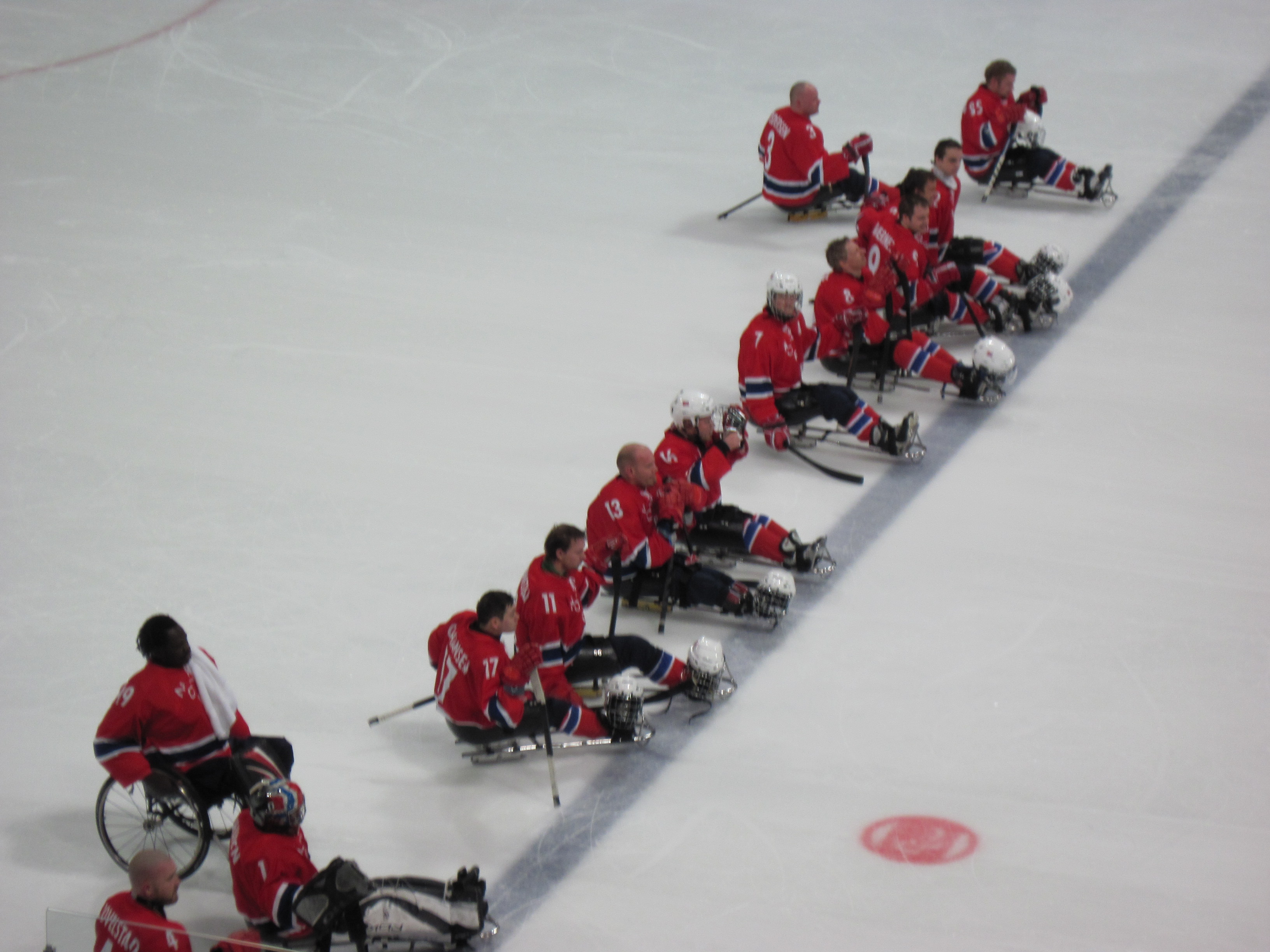
Norway's Ice Sledge Hockey team, at the UBC Thunderbird Winter Sports Centre, Vancouver.

The Norwegian sledge hockey team qualified for the 2010 Paralympics by coming in second place at the 2009 IPC Ice Sledge Hockey World Championships.

Squad list	Group stage (Pool B)		Semifinal	Final	
Squad list	Opposition Result	Rank	Opposition Result	Opposition Result	Rank
From: Ole Bjarte Austevoll; Audun Bakke; Helge Bjørnstad; Kissinger Deng; Eskil Hagen; Thomas Jacobsen; Loyd Remi Johansen; Roger Johansen; Knut Andre Nordstoga; Rolf Einar Pedersen; Tommy Rovelstad; Kjell Vidar Røyne; Stig Tore Svee; Morten Værnes; Head coach: Morten Haglund	Sweden; W 2–1	2 Q	United States; L 0–3	Canada; W 2–1	3rd place, bronze medalist(s)
From: Ole Bjarte Austevoll; Audun Bakke; Helge Bjørnstad; Kissinger Deng; Eskil Hagen; Thomas Jacobsen; Loyd Remi Johansen; Roger Johansen; Knut Andre Nordstoga; Rolf Einar Pedersen; Tommy Rovelstad; Kjell Vidar Røyne; Stig Tore Svee; Morten Værnes; Head coach: Morten Haglund	Italy; W 2–1	2 Q	United States; L 0–3	Canada; W 2–1	3rd place, bronze medalist(s)
From: Ole Bjarte Austevoll; Audun Bakke; Helge Bjørnstad; Kissinger Deng; Eskil Hagen; Thomas Jacobsen; Loyd Remi Johansen; Roger Johansen; Knut Andre Nordstoga; Rolf Einar Pedersen; Tommy Rovelstad; Kjell Vidar Røyne; Stig Tore Svee; Morten Værnes; Head coach: Morten Haglund	Canada; L 0–5	2 Q	United States; L 0–3	Canada; W 2–1	3rd place, bronze medalist(s)

== Wheelchair curling ==
The Norwegian team qualified for the 2010 Paralympic wheelchair curling tournament based on their performance in the 2007, 2008, and 2009 World Wheelchair Curling Championships.

Norway's team continued the tradition from the Norwegian team at the Olympics, wearing pants from Loudmouth Golf.

Squad list	Round robin		Tie-breaker	Semifinal	Final	Rank
Squad list	Opposition Result	Rank	Tie-breaker	Semifinal	Final	Rank
Rune Lorentzen (skip); Jostein Stordahl; Geir Arne Skogstad; Lene Tystad; Anne Mette Samdal	Germany; L 6–10	T6	DNA	DNA	DNA	T6
Rune Lorentzen (skip); Jostein Stordahl; Geir Arne Skogstad; Lene Tystad; Anne Mette Samdal	Great Britain; W 7–5	T6	DNA	DNA	DNA	T6
Rune Lorentzen (skip); Jostein Stordahl; Geir Arne Skogstad; Lene Tystad; Anne Mette Samdal	Canada; L 5–6	T6	DNA	DNA	DNA	T6
Rune Lorentzen (skip); Jostein Stordahl; Geir Arne Skogstad; Lene Tystad; Anne Mette Samdal	Sweden; L 4–6	T6	DNA	DNA	DNA	T6
Rune Lorentzen (skip); Jostein Stordahl; Geir Arne Skogstad; Lene Tystad; Anne Mette Samdal	South Korea; W 9–6	T6	DNA	DNA	DNA	T6
Rune Lorentzen (skip); Jostein Stordahl; Geir Arne Skogstad; Lene Tystad; Anne Mette Samdal	Japan; W 11-3	T6	DNA	DNA	DNA	T6
Rune Lorentzen (skip); Jostein Stordahl; Geir Arne Skogstad; Lene Tystad; Anne Mette Samdal	United States; L 8-9	T6	DNA	DNA	DNA	T6
Rune Lorentzen (skip); Jostein Stordahl; Geir Arne Skogstad; Lene Tystad; Anne Mette Samdal	Italy; L 7-9	T6	DNA	DNA	DNA	T6
Rune Lorentzen (skip); Jostein Stordahl; Geir Arne Skogstad; Lene Tystad; Anne Mette Samdal	Switzerland; L 4-10	T6	DNA	DNA	DNA	T6

== See also ==
- Norway at the 2010 Winter Olympics
- Norway at the Paralympics
