= Para cross-country skiing at the 2010 Winter Paralympics =

Cross-country skiing at the X Paralympic Winter Games
- Venue: Whistler Olympic Park
- Dates: 14–21 March

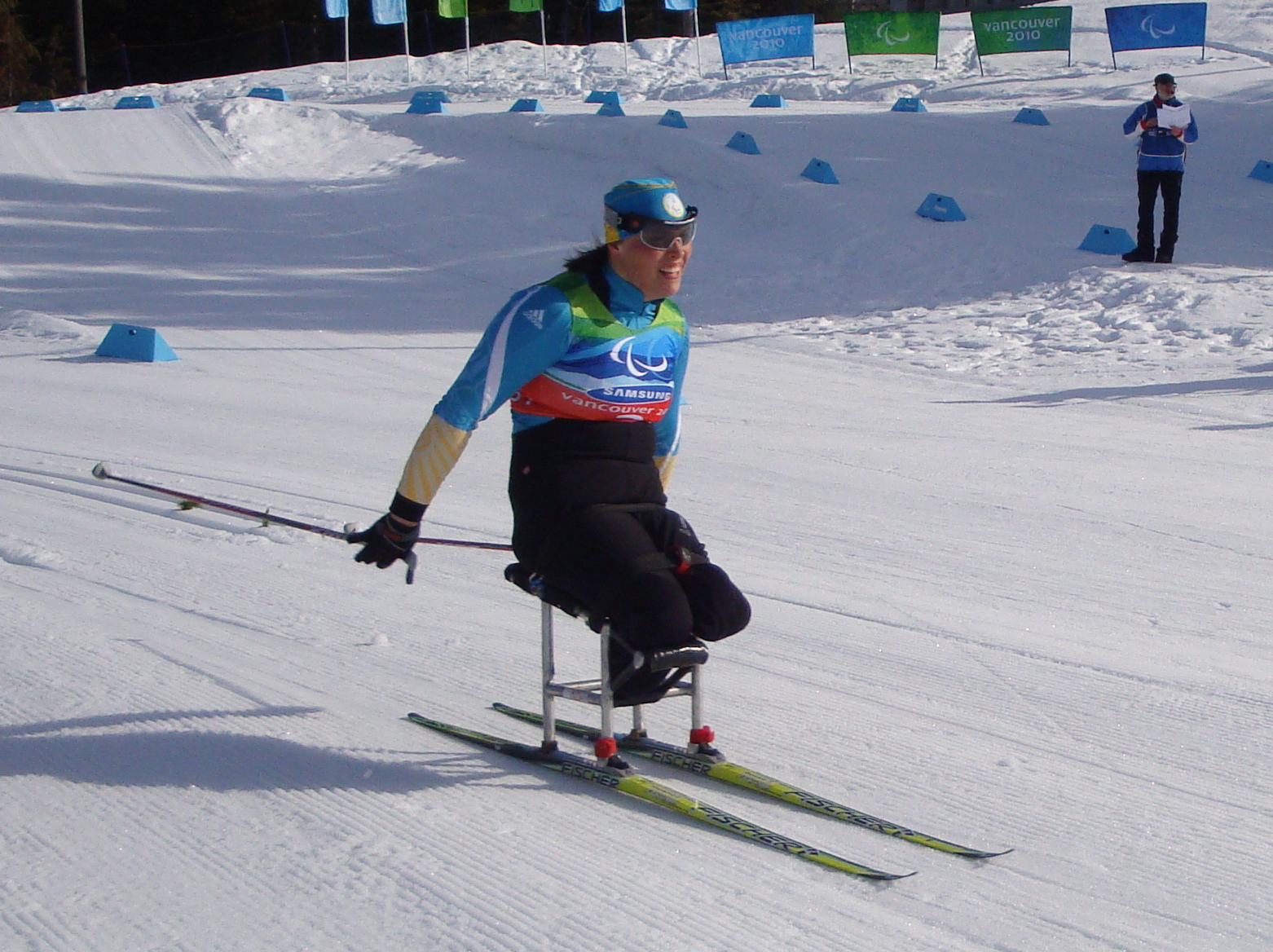
Olena Iurkovska, a paralympic cross-country skier in the 2010 Winter Paralympic Games, Whistler Olympic Park, British Columbia

The cross-country skiing competition of the Vancouver 2010 Paralympics were held at Whistler, British Columbia. The events were held between 14 and 21 March 2010.

== Medal table ==
Rank	Nation	Gold	Silver	Bronze	Total
1	Russia (RUS)	7	9	6	22
2	Canada (CAN)	3	1	1	5
3	Germany (GER)	3	1	0	4
4	Ukraine (UKR)	2	5	2	9
5	Japan (JPN)	2	1	0	3
6	Belarus (BLR)	2	0	6	8
7	Italy (ITA)	1	1	1	3
8	Norway (NOR)	0	2	1	3
9	Finland (FIN)	0	0	1	1
9	Poland (POL)	0	0	1	1
9	Sweden (SWE)	0	0	1	1
Totals (11 entries)		20	20	20	60

== Events ==
The program included a total of 20 events, 10 for men and 10 for women. Competitors are divided into three categories: standing, visually impaired, and sitting. Standing skiers are those that have a locomotive disability but are able to use the same equipment as able-bodied skiers, whereas sitting competitors use a sitski. Visually impaired skiers compete with the help of a sighted guide. The skier with the visual impairment and the guide are considered a team, and dual medals are awarded.

Men

- 1 km sprint
  - Sitting
  - Standing
  - Visually impaired
- 10 km individual
  - Sitting
  - Standing
  - Visually impaired
- 15 km individual
  - Sitting
- 20 km individual
  - Standing
  - Visually impaired
- 1 × 4 km + 2 × 5 km relay

Women

- 1 km sprint
  - Sitting
  - Standing
  - Visually impaired
- 5 km individual
  - Sitting
  - Standing
  - Visually impaired
- 10 km individual
  - Sitting
- 15 km individual
  - Standing
  - Visually impaired
- 3×2.5 km relay

=== Women's events ===
Event	Class	Gold		Silver		Bronze	
1 km Sprint Classic	visually impaired	Verena Bentele; Guide: Thomas Friedrich; Germany	4:14.2	Mikhalina Lysova; Guide: Alexey Ivanov; Russia	4:44.2	Lioubov Vasilieva; Guide: Natalia Yakimova; Russia	4:54.4
1 km Sprint Classic	sitting	Francesca Porcellato; Italy	2:58.5	Olena Iurkovska; Ukraine	3:00.0	Liudmila Vauchok; Belarus	3:01.9
1 km Sprint Classic	standing	Oleksandra Kononova; Ukraine	4:21.4	Shoko Ota; Japan	4:26.8	Anna Burmistrova; Russia	4:31.3
5 km Classic	visually impaired	Verena Bentele; Guide: Thomas Friedrich; Germany	15:08.8	Mikhalina Lysova; Guide: Alexey Ivanov; Russia	16:00.3	Tatiana Ilyuchenko; Guide: Valery Koshkin; Russia	17:18.4
5 km Classic	sitting	Liudmila Vauchok; Belarus	14:56.6	Andrea Eskau; Germany	15:11.4	Colette Bourgonje; Canada	15:16.4
5 km Classic	standing	Oleksandra Kononova; Ukraine	16:01.3	Iuliia Batenkova; Ukraine	16:03.7	Larysa Varona; Belarus	17:38.2
10 km	sitting	Liudmila Vauchok; Belarus	30:52.9	Colette Bourgonje; Canada	31:49.8	Olena Iurkovska; Ukraine	32:43.5
15 km Free	visually impaired	Verena Bentele; Guide: Thomas Friedrich; Germany	45:11.1	Lioubov Vasilieva; Guide: Natalia Yakimova; Russia	48:34.1	Yadviha Skorabahataya; Guide: Vasili Haurukovich; Belarus	49:19.3
15 km Free	standing	Anna Burmistrova; Russia	49:16.3	Iuliia Batenkova; Ukraine	49:23.5	Katarzyna Rogowiec; Poland	51:04.1
3 × 2.5 km Relay	open	Russia (RUS); Maria Iovleva; Mikhalina Lysova; Guide: Alexey Ivanov; Lioubov Vasilieva; Guide: Natalia Yakimova	20:23.2	Ukraine (UKR); Olena Iurkovska; Iuliia Batenkova; Oleksandra Kononova	20:42.7	Belarus (BLR); Larysa Varona; Liudmila Vauchok; Yadviha Skorabahataya; Guide: Vasili Haurukovich	22:04.2

=== Men's events ===
Event	Class	Gold		Silver		Bronze	
1 km Sprint Classic	visually impaired	Brian McKeever; Guide: Robin McKeever; Canada	3:42.9	Nikolay Polukhin; Guide: Andrey Tokarev; Russia	3:47.0	Zebastian Modin; Guide: Albin Ackerot; Sweden	3:50.2
1 km Sprint Classic	sitting	Sergey Shilov; Russia	2:31.8	Irek Zaripov; Russia	2:31.9	Vladimir Kiselev; Russia	2:36.6
1 km Sprint Classic	standing	Yoshihiro Nitta; Japan	3:30.7	Kirill Mikhaylov; Russia	3:32.3	Ilkka Tuomisto; Finland	3:33.9
10 km Classic	visually impaired	Brian McKeever; Guide: Robin McKeever; Canada	26:01.6	Helge Flo; Guide: Thomas Losnegard; Norway	27:27.3	Nikolay Polukhin; Guide: Andrey Tokarev; Russia	27:40.7
10 km Classic	sitting	Irek Zaripov; Russia	27:12.1	Enzo Masiello; Italy	28:21.1	Dzmitry Loban; Belarus	28:25.1
10 km Classic	standing	Yoshihiro Nitta; Japan	26:29.5	Kirill Mikhaylov; Russia	27:01.7	Grygorii Vovchinskiy; Ukraine	27:03.7
15 km	sitting	Irek Zaripov; Russia	41:01.01	Roman Petushkov; Russia	41:11.01	Enzo Masiello; Italy	41:54.09
20 km Free	visually impaired	Brian McKeever; Guide: Robin McKeever; Canada	51:14:7	Nikolay Polukhin; Guide: Andrey Tokarev; Russia	51:55.6	Vasili Shaptsiaboi; Guide: Mikalai Shablouski; Belarus	52:22.5
20 km Free	standing	Kirill Mikhaylov; Russia	52:07.7	Nils-Erik Ulset; Norway	53:34.1	Vladimir Kononov; Russia	53:53.4
1 × 4 km + 2 × 5 km Relay	open	Russia (RUS); Sergey Shilov; Kirill Mikhaylov; Nikolay Polukhin; Guide: Andrey Tokarev	38:54.8	Ukraine (UKR); Iurii Kostiuk; Grygorii Vovchinskyi; Vitaliy Lukyanenko; Guide: Volodymyr Ivanov	39:16.7	Norway (NOR); Trygve Toskedal Larsen; Vegard Dahle; Nils-Erik Ulset	39:48.9

== Competition schedule ==
All times are Pacific Standard Time (UTC-8).

Day	Date	Start	Event
Day 3	Sun 14 Mar	10:00	Men's 15 km, sitting
Day 3	Sun 14 Mar	12:00	Women's 10 km, sitting
Day 4	Mon 15 Mar	10:00	Men's 20 km, standing
Day 4	Mon 15 Mar	10:15	Men's 20 km, visually impaired
Day 4	Mon 15 Mar	12:00	Women's 15 km, standing
Day 4	Mon 15 Mar	12:10	Women's 15 km, visually impaired
Day 7	Thu 18 Mar	10:00	Men's 10 km, standing
Day 7	Thu 18 Mar	10:16	Men's 10 km, visually impaired
Day 7	Thu 18 Mar	10:24	Women's 5 km, standing
Day 7	Thu 18 Mar	10:32	Women's 5 km, visually impaired
Day 7	Thu 18 Mar	11:15	Women's 5 km, sitting
Day 7	Thu 18 Mar	11:35	Men's 10 km, sitting
Day 9	Sat 20 Mar	10:00	Women's 3 × 2.5 km relay
Day 9	Sat 20 Mar	12:00	Men's 1×4 km + 2×5 km relay
Day 10	Sun 21 Mar	10:00	Men's 1 km sprint, sitting
Day 10	Sun 21 Mar	10:18	Women's 1 km sprint, sitting
Day 10	Sun 21 Mar	10:45	Men's 1 km sprint, visually impaired
Day 10	Sun 21 Mar	11:00	Men's 1 km sprint, standing
Day 10	Sun 21 Mar	11:25	Women's 1 km sprint, visually impaired
Day 10	Sun 21 Mar	11:37	Women's 1 km sprint, standing

== See also ==
- Cross-country skiing at the 2010 Winter Olympics
