= Russia at the 2010 Winter Paralympics =

- IPC code: RUS
- NPC: Russian Paralympic Committee
- Website: www.paralymp.ru (in Russian)

in Vancouver
- Competitors: 32 in 3 sports
- Flag bearer: Valery Kupchinskii
- Medals Ranked 2nd: Gold 12 Silver 16 Bronze 10 Total 38

Winter Paralympics appearances (overview)
- 1994; 1998; 2002; 2006; 2010; 2014; 2018–2022; 2026

Other related appearances
- Soviet Union (1988); Unified Team (1992); Neutral Paralympic Athletes (2018)

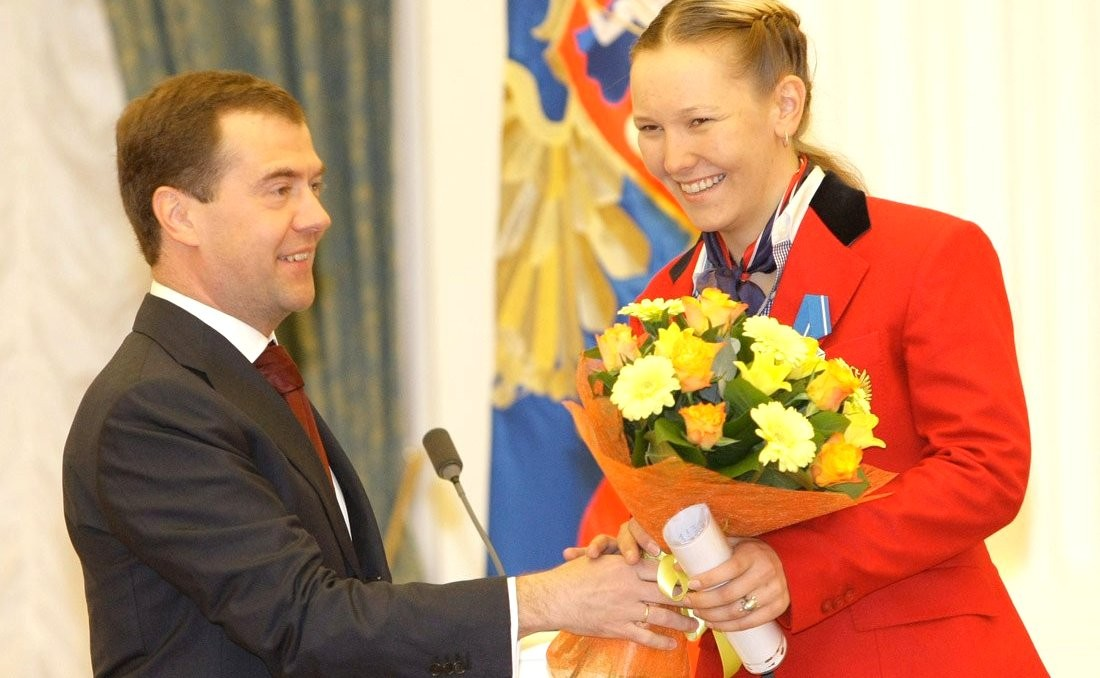
Anna Burmistrova from Russia, awarded the Order of Honour in Russia, for winning two gold, one silver and one bronze in biathlon and Cross-country skiing.

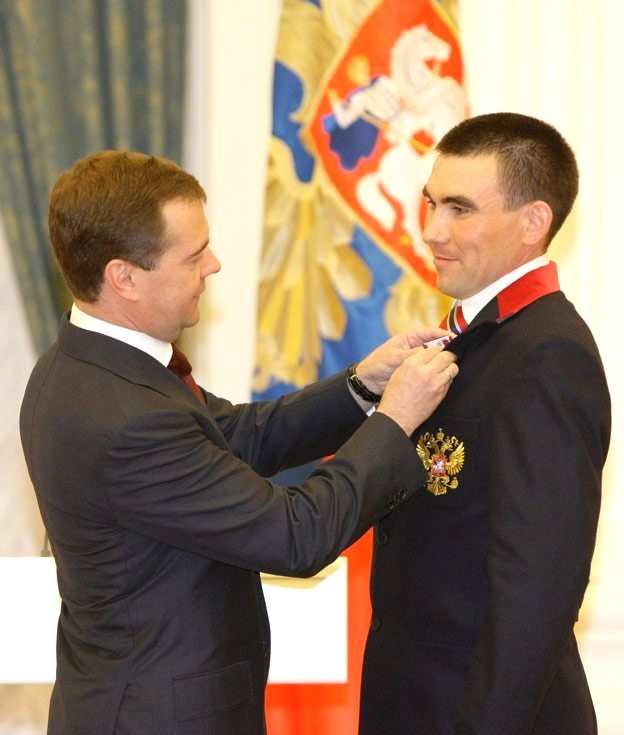
Kirill Mikhaylov from Russia, is awarded the Order For Merit to the Fatherland, fourth degree, in Russia, by President Dmitry Medvedev, for winning three gold and two silver in biathlon and Cross-country skiing.

Russia sent a delegation to compete at the 2010 Winter Paralympics in Vancouver, Canada. The country fielded thirty-two athletes in cross-country skiing, biathlon, and alpine skiing. Russia placed second in the final medal standings, though first in the total medal count, winning thirty-eight medals.

The Moscow Times noted the irony in the fact that there had been high hope for Russia's Winter Olympians, while fairly little attention had been paid to its Paralympians, until their performance stood out with a crop of medals. While the Moscow Times focused on the difficulties faced by the country's Paralympians in their everyday life, however, the Vancouver Sun remarked: "Unlike Canada and other countries where almost all Paralympians must have jobs, Team Russia's competitors are akin to 'sports professionals'. Most don't work so they can focus solely on their training, which is funded by the state and individual sponsors". With Sochi being the host city of the 2014 Winter Paralympics, a Russian segment was performed at the closing ceremony.

== Medalists ==
Medal	Name	Sport	Event	Date
Gold	Irek Zaripov	Biathlon	Men's 2.4 km Pursuit, sitting	March 13
Gold	Kirill Mikhaylov	Biathlon	Men's 3 km Pursuit, standing	March 13
Gold	Anna Burmistrova	Biathlon	Women's 3 km Pursuit, standing	March 13
Gold	Irek Zaripov	Cross-country skiing	Men's 15 km, sitting	March 14
Gold	Kirill Mikhaylov	Cross-country skiing	Men's 20 km Free, standing	March 15
Gold	Anna Burmistrova	Cross-country skiing	Women's 15 km Free, standing	March 15
Gold	Irek Zaripov	Biathlon	Men's 12.5 km Individual, sitting	March 17
Gold	Maria Iovleva	Biathlon	Women's 10 km Individual, sitting	March 17
Gold	Irek Zaripov	Cross-country skiing	Men's 10 km, sitting	March 18
Gold	Liubov Vasilyeva; Mikhalina Lysova; Maria Iovleva	Cross-country skiing	Women's 3×2.5 km Relay	March 20
Gold	Sergey Shilov; Kirill Mikhaylov; Nikolay Polukhin	Cross-country skiing	Men's 1×4 km + 2×5 km Relay	March 20
Gold	Sergey Shilov	Cross-country skiing	Men's 1 km Sprint, sitting	March 21
Silver	Maria Iovleva	Biathlon	Women's 2.4 km Pursuit, sitting	March 13
Silver	Nikolay Polukhin	Biathlon	Men's 3 km Pursuit, visually impaired	March 13
Silver	Liubov Vasilyeva	Biathlon	Women's 3 km Pursuit, visually impaired	March 13
Silver	Roman Petushkov	Cross-country skiing	Men's 15 km, sitting	March 14
Silver	Nikolay Polukhin	Cross-country skiing	Men's 20 km Free, visually impaired	March 15
Silver	Liubov Vasilyeva	Cross-country skiing	Women's 15 km Free, visually impaired	March 15
Silver	Vladimir Kiselev	Biathlon	Men's 12.5 km Individual, sitting	March 17
Silver	Anna Burmistrova	Biathlon	Women's 12.5 km Individual, standing	March 17
Silver	Nikolay Polukhin	Biathlon	Men's 12.5 km Individual, visually impaired	March 17
Silver	Liubov Vasilyeva	Biathlon	Women's 12.5 km Individual, visually impaired	March 17
Silver	Kirill Mikhaylov	Cross-country skiing	Men's 10 km Classic, standing	March 18
Silver	Mikhalina Lysova	Cross-country skiing	Women's 5 km Classic, visually impaired	March 18
Silver	Nikolay Polukhin	Cross-country skiing	Men's 1 km Sprint Classic, visually impaired	March 21
Silver	Mikhalina Lysova	Cross-country skiing	Women's 1 km Sprint Classic, visually impaired	March 21
Silver	Irek Zaripov	Cross-country skiing	Men's 1 km Sprint, sitting	March 21
Silver	Kirill Mikhaylov	Cross-country skiing	Men's 1 km Sprint Classic, standing	March 21
Bronze	Alena Gorbunova	Biathlon	Women's 3 km Pursuit, standing	March 13
Bronze	Mikhalina Lysova	Biathlon	Women's 3 km Pursuit, visually impaired	March 13
Bronze	Vladimir Kononov	Cross-country skiing	Men's 20 km Free, standing	March 15
Bronze	Roman Petushkov	Biathlon	Men's 12.5 km Individual, sitting	March 17
Bronze	Mikhalina Lysova	Biathlon	Women's 12.5 km Individual, visually impaired	March 17
Bronze	Nikolay Polukhin	Cross-country skiing	Men's 10 km Classic, visually impaired	March 18
Bronze	Tatiana Ilyuchenko	Cross-country skiing	Women's 5 km Classic, visually impaired	March 18
Bronze	Liubov Vasilyeva	Cross-country skiing	Women's 1 km Sprint Classic, visually impaired	March 21
Bronze	Vladimir Kiselev	Cross-country skiing	Men's 1 km Sprint, sitting	March 21
Bronze	Anna Burmistrova	Cross-country skiing	Women's 1 km Sprint Classic, standing	March 21

== Alpine skiing ==
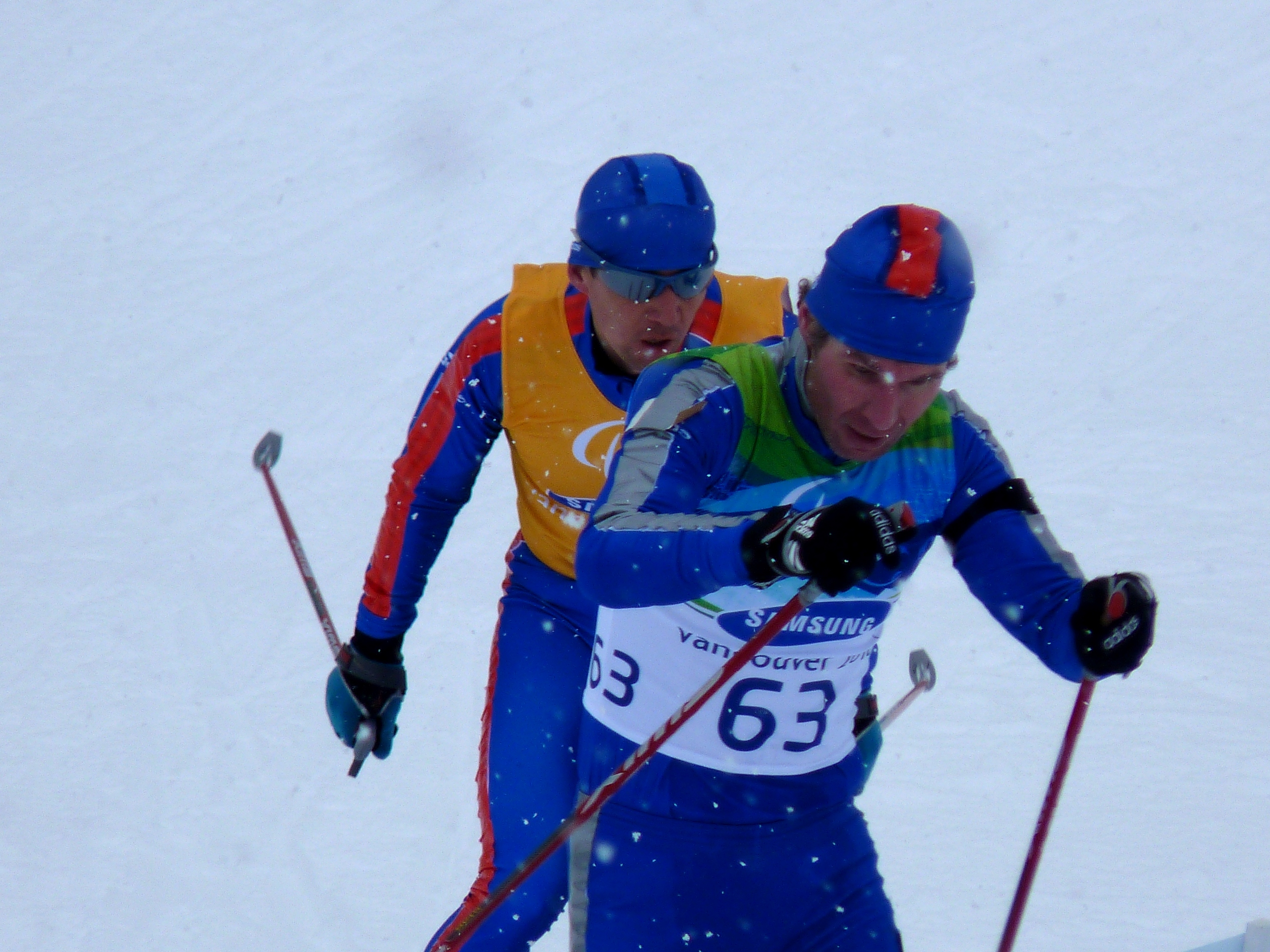
Irek Mannanov in qualification for the Biathlon Men's 3 km Pursuit (Visually Impaired) guided by Salavat Gumerov (in the yellow shirt).

== See also ==
- Russia at the 2010 Winter Olympics
