= Germany at the 2010 Winter Paralympics =

- IPC code: GER
- NPC: National Paralympic Committee Germany
- Website: www.dbs-npc.de (in German)

in Vancouver
- Competitors: 20 in 4 sports
- Flag bearer: Frank Hoefle
- Medals Ranked 1st: Gold 13 Silver 5 Bronze 6 Total 24

Winter Paralympics appearances (overview)
- 1976; 1980; 1984; 1988; 1992; 1994; 1998; 2002; 2006; 2010; 2014; 2018; 2022; 2026

Germany sent 20 competitors to compete in four disciplines at the 2010 Winter Paralympics in Vancouver, British Columbia, Canada. They placed first overall in the medal standings with a total of 13 gold medals.

== Alpine skiing ==
The Alpine Ski Team from Germany won a total of 15 medals. The medalists are:

- (gold) Martin Braxenthaler - Men's Super Combined, sitting
- (gold) Martin Braxenthaler - Men's Giant Slalom, sitting
- (gold) Martin Braxenthaler - Men's Slalom, sitting
- (gold) Gerd Schönfelder - Men's Super Combined, standing
- (gold) Gerd Schönfelder - Men's Super G, standing
- (gold) Gerd Schönfelder - Men's Downhill, standing
- (gold) Gerd Schönfelder - Men's Giant Slalom, standing
- (silver) Martin Braxenthaler - Men's Super G, sitting
- (silver) Gerd Schönfelder - Men's Slalom, standing
- (silver) Andrea Rothfuss - Women's Giant Slalom, standing
- (silver) Andrea Rothfuss - Women's Slalom, standing
- (bronze) Andrea Rothfuss - Women's Super G, standing
- (bronze) Andrea Rothfuss - Women's Downhill, standing
- (bronze) Anna Schaffelhuber - Women's Super G, sitting
- (bronze) Gerd Gradwohl - Men's Downhill, visually impaired

== Biathlon ==
The Biathlon team from Germany won a total of 5 medals at the 2010 Winter Paralympics. The medalists are:

- (gold) Verena Bentele Women's 12.5 km, visually impaired
- (gold) Verena Bentele Women's 3 km, visually impaired
- (gold) Wilhelm Brem Men's 12.5 km, visually impaired
- (bronze) Josef Giesen Men's 12.5 km, standing
- (bronze) Andrea Eskau Women's 10 km, sitting

== Cross-country skiing ==
The German athletes participating in the Cross-country skiing events won a total of 4 medals. The medalists are:

- (gold) Verena Bentele Women's 1 km sprint classic, visually impaired
- (gold) Verena Bentele Women's 5 km classic, visually impaired
- (gold) Verena Bentele Women's 15 km free, visually impaired
- (silver) Andrea Eskau Women's 5 km, sitting

== Wheelchair curling ==
Germany competed in wheelchair curling. They placed last, with a score of 3–6, equaling the teams from Great Britain, Switzerland, Norway and Japan. Their results are:

Squad list	Round robin		Tie-breaker	Semifinal	Final	Rank
Squad list	Result	Rank	Tie-breaker	Semifinal	Final	Rank
Jens Jaeger; Marcus Sieger; Jens Gaebel; Christiane Steger; Astrid Hoer	Norway W(10-6)	T6	DNA	DNA	DNA	T6
Jens Jaeger; Marcus Sieger; Jens Gaebel; Christiane Steger; Astrid Hoer	United States L(5-6)	T6	DNA	DNA	DNA	T6
Jens Jaeger; Marcus Sieger; Jens Gaebel; Christiane Steger; Astrid Hoer	Japan W(12-4)	T6	DNA	DNA	DNA	T6
Jens Jaeger; Marcus Sieger; Jens Gaebel; Christiane Steger; Astrid Hoer	Switzerland L(3-9)	T6	DNA	DNA	DNA	T6
Jens Jaeger; Marcus Sieger; Jens Gaebel; Christiane Steger; Astrid Hoer	Italy W(7-6)	T6	DNA	DNA	DNA	T6
Jens Jaeger; Marcus Sieger; Jens Gaebel; Christiane Steger; Astrid Hoer	Great Britain L(2-9)	T6	DNA	DNA	DNA	T6
Jens Jaeger; Marcus Sieger; Jens Gaebel; Christiane Steger; Astrid Hoer	Canada L(6-8)	T6	DNA	DNA	DNA	T6
Jens Jaeger; Marcus Sieger; Jens Gaebel; Christiane Steger; Astrid Hoer	South Korea L(2-9)	T6	DNA	DNA	DNA	T6
Jens Jaeger; Marcus Sieger; Jens Gaebel; Christiane Steger; Astrid Hoer	Sweden L(3-10)	T6	DNA	DNA	DNA	T6

== See also ==
- Germany at the 2010 Winter Olympics
- Germany at the Paralympics
