= 2011 IPC Biathlon and Cross-Country Skiing World Championships – Women's 5 kilometre freestyle =

The Women's 5 km freestyle events in cross-country skiing at the 2011 IPC Biathlon and Cross-Country Skiing World Championships, were held on April 3, 2011.

== Medals ==
Class	Gold	Silver	Bronze
Sitting	Liudmila Vauchok; Belarus	Francesca Porcellato; Italy	Mariann Marthinsen; Norway
Standing	Katarzyna Rogowiec; Poland	Oleksandra Kononova; Ukraine	Iuliia Batenkova; Ukraine
Visually impaired	Elena Remizova; Guide: Natalia Yakimova; Russia	Mikhalina Lysova; Guide: Alexey Ivanov; Russia	Tatiana Ilyuchenko; Guide: Valery Koshkin; Russia

== Results ==
=== Sitting ===
Rank	Bib	Athlete	Country	Real time	Deficit	Class	%	Time (calculated)
1st place, gold medalist(s)	81	Liudmila Vauchok	Belarus	14:40.9	0.0	LW11	94	13:48.0
2nd place, silver medalist(s)	75	Francesca Porcellato	Italy	16:13.6	+10.8	LW10	86	13:57.3
3rd place, bronze medalist(s)	82	Mariann Marthinsen	Norway	14:05.0	+17.0	LW12	100	14:05.0
4	80	Maria Iovleva	Russia	14:05.4	+17.4	LW12	100	14:05.4
5	76	Andrea Eskau	Germany	15:00.9	+20.0	LW11	94	14:06.8
6	79	Colette Bourgonje	Canada	16:29.8	+27.0	LW10	86	14:11.2
7	77	Lyudmyla Pavlenko	Ukraine	14:36.6	+31.7	LW11.5	98	14:19.1
8	83	Olena Iurkovska	Ukraine	14:44.7	+56.7	LW12	100	14:44.7
9	78	Irina Polyakova	Russia	14:55.3	+1:07.3	LW12	100	14:55.3
10	74	Marta Zaynullina	Russia	15:14.3	+1:26.3	LW12	100	15:14.3
11	72	Anja Wicker	Germany	17:07.7	+1:57.8	LW10.5	91	15:35.2
12	71	Bohdana Karavanska	Ukraine	16:36.7	+2:48.7	LW12	100	16:36.7
13	73	Svetlana Yaroshevich	Russia	20:00.6	+3:57.8	LW10	86	17:12.5

=== Standing ===
Rank	Bib	Athlete	Country	Real time	Deficit	Class	%	Time (calculated)
1st place, gold medalist(s)	59	Katarzyna Rogowiec	Poland	17:07.9	0.0	LW5/7	87	14:54.3
2nd place, silver medalist(s)	53	Oleksandra Kononova	Ukraine	15:23.9	+1.9	LW8	97	14:56.2
3rd place, bronze medalist(s)	51	Iuliia Batenkova	Ukraine	16:47.8	+1:16.2	LW6	96	16:07.5
4	54	Jody Barber	Canada	16:54.0	+1:32.0	LW8	97	16:23.6
5	58	Maija Loytynoja	Finland	16:54.1	+1:32.1	LW8	97	16:23.7
6	55	Arleta Dudziak	Poland	18:46.9	+3:24.9	LW8	97	18:13.1
7	52	Kelly Underkofler	United States	19:00.5	+3:38.5	LW8	97	18:26.3
8	56	Larysa Varona	Belarus	20:10.6	+4:48.6	LW8	97	19:34.3
	57	Anna Burmistrova	Russia	DNS		LW8	97	

=== Visually impaired ===
Rank	Bib	Athlete	Country	Real time	Deficit	Class	%	Time (calculated)
1st place, gold medalist(s)	65	Elena Remizova; Guide: Natalia Yakimova	Russia	14:49.3	0.0	B2	98	14:31.5
2nd place, silver medalist(s)	66	Mikhalina Lysova; Guide: Alexey Ivanov	Russia	15:01.9	+30.4	B3	100	15:01.9
3rd place, bronze medalist(s)	64	Tatiana Ilyuchenko; Guide: Valery Koshkin	Russia	15:25.2	+53.7	B3	100	15:25.2
4	67	Liubov Vasilyeva; Guide: Tatiana Polovnikova	Russia	15:50.3	+1:01.0	B2	98	15:31.3
5	61	Elvira Kalabina; Guide: Sergey Syniakin	Russia	16:07.6	+1:36.1	B3	100	16:07.6
6	63	Oksana Shyshkova; Guide: Volodymyr Ivanov	Ukraine	16:34.7	+1:45.4	B2	98	16:14.8
7	62	Vivian Hoesch; Guide: Norman Schlee	Germany	20:23.7	+3:18.4	B1	85	17:20.1
