= 2011 IPC Biathlon and Cross-Country Skiing World Championships – Women's sprint =

The Women's sprint events in cross-country skiing at the 2011 IPC Biathlon and Cross-Country Skiing World Championships, were held on April 8, 2011.

== Medals ==
| Class | Gold | Silver | Bronze |
|---|---|---|---|
| Sitting | Andrea Eskau; Germany | Maria Iovleva; Russia | Mariann Marthinsen; Norway |
| Standing | Oleksandra Kononova; Ukraine | Katarzyna Rogowiec; Poland | Maija Loytynoja; Finland |
| Visually impaired | Mikhalina Lysova; Guide: Alexey Ivanov; Russia | Oksana Shyshkova; Guide: Volodymyr Ivanov; Ukraine | Tatiana Ilyuchenko; Guide: Valery Koshkin; Russia |

== Results ==
=== Sitting ===
The women's 0.9 km sprint, sitting. Skiers compete on a sitski.

==== Qualification ====
| Rank | Bib | Athlete | Country | Real time | Deficit | Class | % | Time (calculated) | Note |
|---|---|---|---|---|---|---|---|---|---|
| 1 | 33 | Mariann Marthinsen | Norway | 2:21.17 | 0.0 | LW12 | 100 | 2:21.17 | Q |
| 2 | 31 | Liudmila Vauchok | Belarus | 2:31.11 | +0.9 | LW11 | 94 | 2:22.04 | Q |
| 3 | 40 | Maria Iovleva | Russia | 2:22.95 | +1.7 | LW12 | 100 | 2:22.95 | Q |
| 4 | 39 | Andrea Eskau | Germany | 2:33.96 | +3.7 | LW11 | 94 | 2:24.72 | Q |
| 5 | 43 | Francesca Porcellato | Italy | 2:54.85 | +10.6 | LW10 | 86 | 2:30.37 | Q |
| 6 | 32 | Olena Iurkovska | Ukraine | 2:31.31 | +10.1 | LW12 | 100 | 2:31.31 | Q |
| 7 | 41 | Irina Polyakova | Russia | 2:33.05 | +11.8 | LW12 | 100 | 2:33.05 | Q |
| 8 | 34 | Colette Bourgonje | Canada | 2:58.82 | +14.6 | LW10 | 86 | 2:33.79 | Q |
| 9 | 38 | Marta Zaynullina | Russia | 2:39.89 | +18.6 | LW12 | 100 | 2:39.89 | |
| 10 | 35 | Anja Wicker | Germany | 2:59.51 | +24.4 | LW10.5 | 91 | 2:43.35 | |
| 11 | 37 | Bohdana Karavanska | Ukraine | 2:48.05 | +26.8 | LW12 | 100 | 2:48.05 | |
| 12 | 36 | Svetlana Yaroshevich | Russia | 3:40.68 | +56.4 | LW10 | 86 | 3:09.79 | |
| | 42 | Lyudmyla Pavlenko | Ukraine | DNS | | LW11.5 | 98 | | |

==== Semifinals ====
Semifinal 1

| Rank | Seed | Athlete | Country | Real time | Class | % | Time (calculated) | Deficit | Note |
|---|---|---|---|---|---|---|---|---|---|
| 1 | 4 | Andrea Eskau | Germany | | LW11 | 94 | 2:53.0 | 0.0 | Q |
| 2 | 1 | Mariann Marthinsen | Norway | | LW12 | 100 | 2:53.4 | +0.4 | Q |
| 3 | 5 | Francesca Porcellato | Italy | | LW10 | 86 | 2:57.2 | +4.2 | |
| 4 | 8 | Colette Bourgonje | Canada | | LW10 | 86 | 3:01.3 | +8.3 | |

Semifinal 2

| Rank | Seed | Athlete | Country | Real time | Class | % | Time (calculated) | Deficit | Note |
|---|---|---|---|---|---|---|---|---|---|
| 1 | 3 | Maria Iovleva | Russia | | LW12 | 100 | 2:34.6 | 0.0 | Q |
| 2 | 2 | Liudmila Vauchok | Belarus | | LW11 | 94 | 2:41.2 | +6.6 | Q |
| 3 | 6 | Olena Iurkovska | Ukraine | | LW12 | 100 | 2:46.1 | +11.5 | |
| 4 | 7 | Irina Polyakova | Russia | | LW12 | 100 | 2:48.4 | +13.8 | |

==== Finals ====
| Rank | Seed | Athlete | Country | Real time | Class | % | Time (calculated) | Deficit | Note |
|---|---|---|---|---|---|---|---|---|---|
| 1st place, gold medalist(s) | 4 | Andrea Eskau | Germany | | LW11 | 94 | 2:39.1 | 0.0 | |
| 2nd place, silver medalist(s) | 3 | Maria Iovleva | Russia | | LW12 | 100 | 2:40.6 | +1.5 | |
| 3rd place, bronze medalist(s) | 1 | Mariann Marthinsen | Norway | | LW12 | 100 | 2:45.4 | +6.3 | |
| 4 | 2 | Liudmila Vauchok | Belarus | | LW11 | 94 | 2:48.6 | +9.5 | |

==== Final standings ====
The final standings of the women's 0.9 km sprint, sitting.

| Rank | Athlete | Country |
|---|---|---|
| 1st place, gold medalist(s) | Andrea Eskau | Germany |
| 2nd place, silver medalist(s) | Maria Iovleva | Russia |
| 3rd place, bronze medalist(s) | Mariann Marthinsen | Norway |
| 4 | Liudmila Vauchok | Belarus |
| 5 | Francesca Porcellato | Italy |
| 6 | Olena Iurkovska | Ukraine |
| 7 | Irina Polyakova | Russia |
| 8 | Colette Bourgonje | Canada |
| 9 | Marta Zaynullina | Russia |
| 10 | Anja Wicker | Germany |
| 11 | Bohdana Karavanska | Ukraine |
| 12 | Svetlana Yaroshevich | Russia |
| DNS | Lyudmyla Pavlenko | Ukraine |

=== Standing ===
The women's 1 km sprint free, standing.

==== Qualification ====
| Rank | Bib | Athlete | Country | Real time | Deficit | Class | % | Time (calculated) | Note |
|---|---|---|---|---|---|---|---|---|---|
| 1 | 113 | Katarzyna Rogowiec | Poland | 3:41.10 | 0.0 | LW5/7 | 87 | 3:12.36 | Q |
| 2 | 117 | Oleksandra Kononova | Ukraine | 3:23.33 | +5.0 | LW8 | 97 | 3:17.23 | Q |
| 3 | 112 | Maija Loytynoja | Finland | 3:29.63 | +11.3 | LW8 | 97 | 3:23.34 | Q |
| 4 | 114 | Iuliia Batenkova | Ukraine | 3:43.53 | +23.1 | LW6 | 96 | 3:34.59 | Q |
| 5 | 118 | Arleta Dudziak | Poland | 3:54.46 | +36.1 | LW8 | 97 | 3:47.43 | Q |
| 6 | 116 | Kelly Underkofler | United States | 4:18.53 | +1:00.2 | LW8 | 97 | 4:10.77 | Q |
| | 111 | Anna Burmistrova | Russia | DNS | | LW8 | 97 | | |
| | 115 | Jody Barber | Canada | DNS | | LW8 | 97 | | |

==== Semifinals ====
Semifinal 1

| Rank | Seed | Athlete | Country | Real time | Class | % | Time (calculated) | Deficit | Note |
|---|---|---|---|---|---|---|---|---|---|
| 1 | 1 | Katarzyna Rogowiec | Poland | | LW5/7 | 87 | 4:11.6 | 0.0 | Q |
| 2 | 4 | Iuliia Batenkova | Ukraine | | LW6 | 96 | 4:27.2 | +15.6 | Q |
| 3 | 5 | Arleta Dudziak | Poland | | LW8 | 97 | 4:42.9 | +31.3 | |

Semifinal 2

| Rank | Seed | Athlete | Country | Real time | Class | % | Time (calculated) | Deficit | Note |
|---|---|---|---|---|---|---|---|---|---|
| 1 | 3 | Maija Loytynoja | Finland | | LW8 | 97 | 4:03.1 | 0.0 | Q |
| 2 | 2 | Oleksandra Kononova | Ukraine | | LW8 | 97 | 4:04.0 | +0.9 | Q |
| 3 | 6 | Kelly Underkofler | United States | | LW8 | 97 | 4:25.5 | +22.4 | |

==== Finals ====
| Rank | Seed | Athlete | Country | Real time | Class | % | Time (calculated) | Deficit | Note |
|---|---|---|---|---|---|---|---|---|---|
| 1st place, gold medalist(s) | 2 | Oleksandra Kononova | Ukraine | | LW8 | 97 | 4:05.6 | 0.0 | |
| 2nd place, silver medalist(s) | 1 | Katarzyna Rogowiec | Poland | | LW5/7 | 87 | 4:09.8 | +4.2 | |
| 3rd place, bronze medalist(s) | 3 | Maija Loytynoja | Finland | | LW8 | 97 | 4:09.9 | +4.3 | |
| 4 | 4 | Iuliia Batenkova | Ukraine | | LW6 | 96 | 4:24.1 | +18.5 | |

==== Final standings ====
The final standings of the women's 1 km sprint free, standing.

| Rank | Athlete | Country |
|---|---|---|
| 1st place, gold medalist(s) | Oleksandra Kononova | Ukraine |
| 2nd place, silver medalist(s) | Katarzyna Rogowiec | Poland |
| 3rd place, bronze medalist(s) | Maija Loytynoja | Finland |
| 4 | Iuliia Batenkova | Ukraine |
| 5 | Arleta Dudziak | Poland |
| 6 | Kelly Underkofler | United States |
| DNS | Anna Burmistrova | Russia |
| DNS | Jody Barber | Canada |

=== Visually impaired ===
In the women's 1 km sprint free, visually impaired, skiers with a visual impairment compete with a sighted guide. Dual medals are rewarded.

==== Qualification ====
| Rank | Bib | Athlete | Country | Real time | Deficit | Class | % | Time (calculated) | Note |
|---|---|---|---|---|---|---|---|---|---|
| 1 | 102 | Elena Remizova; Guide: Natalia Yakimova | Russia | 3:13.80 | 0.0 | B2 | 98 | 3:09.92 | Q |
| 2 | 101 | Mikhalina Lysova; Guide: Alexey Ivanov | Russia | 3:10.82 | +0.9 | B3 | 100 | 3:10.82 | Q |
| 3 | 104 | Tatiana Ilyuchenko; Guide: Valery Koshkin | Russia | 3:15.47 | +5.5 | B3 | 100 | 3:15.47 | Q |
| 4 | 103 | Liubov Vasilyeva; Guide: Tatiana Maltseva | Russia | 3:27.44 | +13.6 | B2 | 98 | 3:23.29 | Q |
| 5 | 107 | Oksana Shyshkova; Guide: Volodymyr Ivanov | Ukraine | 3:33.56 | +19.7 | B2 | 98 | 3:29.29 | Q |
| 6 | 108 | Vivian Hoesch; Guide: Norman Schlee | Germany | 4:13.98 | +30.5 | B1 | 85 | 3:35.88 | Q |
| 7 | 106 | Iuliia Budaleeva; Guide: Tatiana Polovnikova | Russia | 4:29.38 | +1:15.5 | B2 | 98 | 4:23.99 | Q |
| | 105 | Valentina Nevidimova; Guide: Alexander Maltsev | Russia | DNS | | B1 | 85 | | |

==== Semifinals ====
Semifinal 1

| Rank | Seed | Athlete | Country | Real time | Class | % | Time (calculated) | Deficit | Note |
|---|---|---|---|---|---|---|---|---|---|
| 1 | 1 | Elena Remizova; Guide: Natalia Yakimova | Russia | | B2 | 98 | 3:26.0 | 0.0 | Q |
| 2 | 5 | Oksana Shyshkova; Guide: Volodymyr Ivanov | Ukraine | | B2 | 98 | 3:27.6 | +1.6 | Q |
| 3 | 4 | Liubov Vasilyeva; Guide: Tatiana Maltseva | Russia | | B2 | 98 | 3:29.5 | +3.5 | |

Semifinal 2

| Rank | Seed | Athlete | Country | Real time | Class | % | Time (calculated) | Deficit | Note |
|---|---|---|---|---|---|---|---|---|---|
| 1 | 2 | Mikhalina Lysova; Guide: Alexey Ivanov | Russia | | B3 | 100 | 4:13.2 | 0.0 | Q |
| 2 | 3 | Tatiana Ilyuchenko; Guide: Valery Koshkin | Russia | | B3 | 100 | 4:14.7 | +1.5 | Q |
| 3 | 6 | Vivian Hoesch; Guide: Norman Schlee | Germany | | B1 | 85 | 4:27.2 | +14.00 | |
| 4 | 7 | Iuliia Budaleeva; Guide: Tatiana Polovnikova | Russia | | B2 | 98 | 5:13.4 | +1:00.2 | |

==== Finals ====
| Rank | Seed | Athlete | Country | Real time | Class | % | Time (calculated) | Deficit | Note |
|---|---|---|---|---|---|---|---|---|---|
| 1st place, gold medalist(s) | 2 | Mikhalina Lysova; Guide: Alexey Ivanov | Russia | | B3 | 100 | 3:25.5 | 0.0 | |
| 2nd place, silver medalist(s) | 5 | Oksana Shyshkova; Guide: Volodymyr Ivanov | Ukraine | | B2 | 98 | 3:30.2 | +4.7 | |
| 3rd place, bronze medalist(s) | 3 | Tatiana Ilyuchenko; Guide: Valery Koshkin | Russia | | B3 | 100 | 3:35.3 | +9.8 | |
| 4 | 1 | Elena Remizova; Guide: Natalia Yakimova | Russia | | B2 | 98 | 3:52.3 | +26.8 | |

==== Final standings ====
The final standings of the women's 1 km sprint free, visually impaired.

| Rank | AthleteS | Country |
|---|---|---|
| 1st place, gold medalist(s) | Mikhalina Lysova; Guide: Alexey Ivanov | Russia |
| 2nd place, silver medalist(s) | Oksana Shyshkova; Guide: Volodymyr Ivanov | Ukraine |
| 3rd place, bronze medalist(s) | Tatiana Ilyuchenko; Guide: Valery Koshkin | Russia |
| 4 | Elena Remizova; Guide: Natalia Yakimova | Russia |
| 5 | Liubov Vasilyeva; Guide: Tatiana Maltseva | Russia |
| 6 | Vivian Hoesch; Guide: Norman Schlee | Germany |
| 7 | Iuliia Budaleeva; Guide: Tatiana Polovnikova | Russia |
| DNS | Valentina Nevidimova; Guide: Alexander Maltsev | Russia |

== See also ==
- FIS Nordic World Ski Championships 2011 – Women's sprint
