= 2011 IPC Biathlon and Cross-Country Skiing World Championships – Women's pursuit =

The women's pursuit competitions in biathlon of the 2011 IPC Biathlon and Cross-Country Skiing World Championships were held on April 2, 2011.

== Medals ==
Class	Gold	Silver	Bronze
Sitting	Maria Iovleva; Russia	Olena Iurkovska; Ukraine	Andrea Eskau; Germany
Standing	Anna Burmistrova; Russia	Katarzyna Rogowiec; Poland	Oleksandra Kononova; Ukraine
Visually impaired	Mikhalina Lysova; Guide: Alexey Ivanov; Russia	Oksana Shyshkova; Guide: Volodymyr Ivanov; Ukraine	Elena Remizova; Guide: Natalia Yakimova; Russia

== Results ==
=== Sitting ===
The women's 3 km pursuit, sitting. Skiers compete on a sitski.

==== Qualification ====
09:10 local time

Rank	Bib	Name	Country	Penalties (P+P)	Time (calculated)	Deficit
1	27	Maria Iovleva	Russia	1 (0+1)	11:10.01	0.00
2	22	Andrea Eskau	Germany	1 (1+0)	11:28.8	+18.66
3	23	Olena Iurkovska	Ukraine	2 (1+1)	11:35.1	+25.00
4	21	Lyudmyla Pavlenko	Ukraine	1 (0+1)	12:13.4	+1:03.28
5	24	Marta Zaynullina	Russia	1 (0+1)	12:31.1	+1:20.93
6	29	Bohdana Karavanska	Ukraine	1 (1+0)	12:57.3	+1:47.17
7	28	Irina Polyakova	Russia	4 (0+4)	13:48.1	+2:38.01
8	26	Svetlana Yaroshevich	Russia	0 (0+0)	14:43.9	+3:33.73
9	25	Anja Wicker	Germany	7 (3+4)	15:02.3	+3:52.13

==== Final ====
15:35 local time

Rank	Bib	Name	Country	Penalties (P+P)	Time (calculated)	Deficit
1st place, gold medalist(s)	24	Maria Iovleva	Russia	3 (1+2)	12:06.6	0.0
2nd place, silver medalist(s)	25	Olena Iurkovska	Ukraine	2 (2+0)	12:18.6	+12.0
3rd place, bronze medalist(s)	23	Andrea Eskau	Germany	5 (3+2)	13:44.4	+1:37.8
4	27	Marta Zaynullina	Russia	1 (1+0)	13:53.5	+1:46.9
5	26	Lyudmyla Pavlenko	Ukraine	3 (2+1)	14:19.2	+2:12.6
6	28	Bohdana Karavanska	Ukraine	1 (1+0)	15:00.4	+2:53.8
7	29	Irina Polyakova	Russia	2 (1+1)	15:28.1	+3:21.5

=== Standing ===
The women's 3.6 km pursuit, standing.

==== Qualification ====
Rank	Bib	Name	Country	Start	Penalties (P+P)	Time (calculated)	Deficit
1	52	Anna Burmistrova	Russia	0 (0+0)	10:44.0	0.0	
2	54	Katarzyna Rogowiec	Poland	0 (0+0)	10:51.7	+7.61	
3	51	Oleksandra Kononova	Ukraine	2 (1+1)	11:01.7	+17.69	
4	53	Maija Loytynoja	Finland	1 (1+0)	11:13.6	+29:59	
5	56	Jody Barber	Canada	4 (3+1)	13:03.9	+2:19.85	
6	58	Arleta Dudziak	Poland	2 (2+0)	13:11.9	+2:27.87	
7	57	Kelly Underkofler	United States	4 (2+2)	13:42.1	+2:58.09	
8	55	Pamela Novaglio	Italy	4 (2+2)	14:24.7	+3:40.65	

==== Final ====
Rank	Bib	Name	Country	Penalties (P+P)	Time (calculated)	Deficit
1st place, gold medalist(s)	54	Anna Burmistrova	Russia	1 (0+1)	12:03.5	0.0
2nd place, silver medalist(s)	53	Katarzyna Rogowiec	Poland	0 (0+0)	12:08.2	+4.7
3rd place, bronze medalist(s)	55	Oleksandra Kononova	Ukraine	2 (2+0)	12:35.9	+32.4
4	56	Maija Loytynoja	Finland	1 (0+1)	13:07.5	+1:04.0
5	57	Jody Barber	Canada	2 (0+2)	16:02.8	+3:59.3
6	58	Arleta Dudziak	Poland	2 (1+1)	17:14.6	+5:11.1
7	59	Kelly Underkofler	United States	3 (1+2)	17:56.2	+5:52.7

=== Visually impaired ===
The women's 3.6 km pursuit, visually impaired. Skiers with a visual impairment compete with a sighted guide. Dual medals are rewarded.

==== Qualification ====
Rank	Bib	Name	Country	Penalties (P+P)	Time (calculated)	Deficit
1	82	Mikhalina Lysova; Guide: Alexey Ivanov	Russia	0 (0+0)	10:28.8	0.00
2	83	Elena Remizova; Guide: Natalia Yakimova	Russia	2 (1+1)	11:00.4	+31.61
3	84	Oksana Shyshkova; Guide: Volodymyr Ivanov	Ukraine	1 (0+1)	11:23.9	+55.17
4	81	Tatiana Ilyuchenko; Guide: Valery Koshkin	Russia	2 (0+2)	11:34.0	+1:05.24
5	89	Liubov Vasilyeva; Guide: Tatiana Polovnikova	Russia	2 (2+0)	12:02.2	+1:33.45
6	88	Vivian Hoesch; Guide: Norman Schlee	Germany	2 (0+2)	12:28.2	+1:59.38
7	87	Elvira Kalabina; Guide: Sergey Syniakin	Russia	1 (1+0)	12:37.3	+2:08.52
8	85	Valentina Nevidimova; Guide: Alexander Maltsev	Russia	2 (2+0)	12:42.7	+2:13.97
9	86	Iuliia Budaleeva; Guide: Ilya Cherepanov	Russia	0 (0+0)	13:13.7	+2:44.94

==== Final ====
Rank	Bib	Name	Country	Penalties (P+P)	Time (calculated)	Deficit
1st place, gold medalist(s)	83	Mikhalina Lysova; Guide: Alexey Ivanov	Russia	1 (1+0)	10:30.7	0.0
2nd place, silver medalist(s)	87	Oksana Shyshkova; Guide: Volodymyr Ivanov	Ukraine	0 (0+0)	11:35.5	+1:04.8
3rd place, bronze medalist(s)	84	Elena Remizova; Guide: Natalia Yakimova	Russia	3 (2+1)	11:52.1	+1:21.4
4	88	Tatiana Ilyuchenko; Guide: Valery Koshkin	Russia	3 (3+0)	13:02.8	+2:32.1
5	89	Liubov Vasilyeva; Guide: Tatiana Polovnikova	Russia	2 (0+2)	13:36.5	+3:05.8
6	85	Vivian Hoesch; Guide: Norman Schlee	Germany	1 (1+0)	14:38.8	+4:08.1
7	90	Elvira Kalabina; Guide: Sergey Syniakin	Russia	4 (3+1)	15:14.4	+4:43.7
8	86	Valentina Nevidimova; Guide: Alexander Maltsev	Russia	2 (1+1)	16:09.8	+5:39.1
9	91	Iuliia Budaleeva; Guide: Ilya Cherepanov	Russia	2 (2+0)	16:55.8	+6:25.1

== See also ==
- Biathlon World Championships 2011 – Women's pursuit
