= 2011 IPC Biathlon and Cross-Country Skiing World Championships – Women's 7.5 km =

The women's 7.5 km competitions in biathlon of the 2011 IPC Biathlon and Cross-Country Skiing World Championships were held on April 7, 2011.

== Medals ==
| Class | Gold | Silver | Bronze |
|---|---|---|---|
| Sitting | Olena Iurkovska; Ukraine | Lyudmyla Pavlenko; Ukraine | Andrea Eskau; Germany |
| Standing | Oleksandra Kononova; Ukraine | Katarzyna Rogowiec; Poland | Maija Loytynoja; Finland |
| Visually impaired | Elena Remizova; Guide: Natalia Yakimova; Russia | Mikhalina Lysova; Guide: Alexey Ivanov; Russia | Tatiana Ilyuchenko; Guide: Valery Koshkin; Russia |

== Results ==
=== Sitting ===
The women's 7.5 km, sitting. Skiers compete on a sitski.

==== Final ====
| Rank | Bib | Name | Country | Penalties (P+P) | Time (calculated) | Deficit |
|---|---|---|---|---|---|---|
| 1st place, gold medalist(s) | 28 | Olena Iurkovska | Ukraine | 0 (0+0) | 23:02.3 | 0.0 |
| 2nd place, silver medalist(s) | 27 | Lyudmyla Pavlenko | Ukraine | 0 (0+0) | 23:45.2 | +42.9 |
| 3rd place, bronze medalist(s) | 29 | Andrea Eskau | Germany | 2 (2+0) | 24:05.7 | +1:03.4 |
| 4 | 21 | Anja Wicker | Germany | 2 (2+0) | 26:09.4 | +3:07.1 |
| 5 | 22 | Marta Zaynullina | Russia | 2 (1+1) | 26:15.1 | +3:12.8 |
| 6 | 25 | Maria Iovleva | Russia | 4 (1+3) | 26:19.4 | +3:17.1 |
| 7 | 26 | Irina Polyakova | Russia | 5 (2+3) | 27:39.0 | +4:36.7 |
| 8 | 24 | Svetlana Yaroshevich | Russia | 1 (1+0) | 28:36.7 | +5:34.4 |
| 9 | 23 | Bohdana Karavanska | Ukraine | 1 (0+1) | 28:36.9 | +5:34.6 |

=== Standing ===
The women's 7.5 km, standing.

==== Final ====
| Rank | Bib | Name | Country | Penalties (P+P) | Time (calculated) | Deficit |
|---|---|---|---|---|---|---|
| 1st place, gold medalist(s) | 59 | Oleksandra Kononova | Ukraine | 1 (0+1) | 24:43.7 | 0.0 |
| 2nd place, silver medalist(s) | 53 | Katarzyna Rogowiec | Poland | 1 (1+0) | 25:35.6 | +51.9 |
| 3rd place, bronze medalist(s) | 58 | Maija Loytynoja | Finland | 0 (0+0) | 26:34.7 | +1:51.0 |
| 4 | 52 | Jody Barber | Canada | 2 (0+2) | 27:59.6 | +3:15.9 |
| 5 | 54 | Iuliia Batenkova | Ukraine | 2 (1+1) | 28:25.6 | +3:41.9 |
| 6 | 51 | Kelly Underkofler | United States | 0 (0+0) | 31:04.3 | +6:20.6 |
| 7 | 56 | Pamela Novaglio | Italy | 1 (1+0) | 31:15.6 | +6:31.9 |
| 8 | 55 | Arleta Dudziak | Poland | 4 (1+3) | 32:58.1 | +8:14.4 |
| | 57 | Anna Burmistrova | Russia | | DNS | |

=== Visually impaired ===
In the women's 7.5 km, visually impaired, skiers with a visual impairment compete with a sighted guide. Dual medals are rewarded.

==== Final ====
| Rank | Bib | Name | Country | Penalties (P+P) | Time (calculated) | Deficit |
|---|---|---|---|---|---|---|
| 1st place, gold medalist(s) | 88 | Elena Remizova; Guide: Natalia Yakimova | Russia | 3 (1+2) | 26:35.0 | 0.0 |
| 2nd place, silver medalist(s) | 87 | Mikhalina Lysova; Guide: Alexey Ivanov | Russia | 0 (0+0) | 27:20.3 | +45.3 |
| 3rd place, bronze medalist(s) | 89 | Tatiana Ilyuchenko; Guide: Valery Koshkin | Russia | 2 (1+1) | 27:25.1 | +50.1 |
| 4 | 83 | Liubov Vasilyeva; Guide: Tatiana Maltseva | Russia | 0 (0+0) | 27:30.4 | +55.4 |
| 5 | 86 | Oksana Shyshkova; Guide: Volodymyr Ivanov | Ukraine | 0 (0+0) | 27:40.0 | +1:05.0 |
| 6 | 85 | Elvira Kalabina; Guide: Irina Sitnikova | Russia | 2 (1+1) | 28:58.9 | +2:23.9 |
| 7 | 84 | Yadviha Skorabahataya; Guide: Vasili Haurukovich | Belarus | 3 (2+1) | 30:17.3 | +3:42.3 |
| 8 | 82 | Vivian Hoesch; Guide: Norman Schlee | Germany | 2 (1+1) | 30:29.5 | +3:54.5 |
| 9 | 81 | Iuliia Budaleeva; Guide: Ilya Cherepanov | Russia | 2 (0+2) | 32:49.6 | +6:14.6 |
