= Cross-country skiing at the 2010 Winter Paralympics – Women's 1 km Sprint Classic =

Women's 1 km Sprint Classic at the X Paralympic Winter Games
- Paralympic cross-country skiing
- Venue: Whistler Olympic Park
- Dates: March 21

The Women's 1 km Sprint Classic competition of the Vancouver 2010 Paralympics was held at Whistler Olympic Park in Whistler, British Columbia. The competition took place on Thursday, March 21.

== Visually impaired ==
In the cross-country skiing 1 km Sprint visually impaired, the athlete with a visual impairment has a sighted guide. The two skiers are considered a team, and dual medals are awarded.

=== Qualification ===
Rank	Bib	Name	Country	Time	Difference
1	2	Mikhalina Lysova; Guide: Alexey Ivanov	Russia	3:57.47	
2	5	Verena Bentele; Guide: Thomas Friedrich	Germany	3:59.59	+2.12
3	4	Tatiana Ilyuchenko; Guide: Valery Koshkin	Russia	3:59.69	+2.22
4	3	Lioubov Vasilieva; Guide: Natalia Yakimova	Russia	4:16.26	+18.79
5	10	Robbi Weldon; Guide: Brian Berry	Canada	4:19.23	+21.76
6	9	Yurie Kanuma; Guide: Norio Odaira	Japan	4:21.77	+24.30
7	1	Oksana Shyshkova; Guide: Dmytro Artomin	Ukraine	4:29.24	+31.77
8	6	Courtney Knight; Guide: Andrea Bundon	Canada	4:40.66	+43.19
9	7	Margarita Gorbounova; Guide: Robert D'Arras	Canada	4:44.19	+46.72
10	11	Nathalie Morin; Guide: Stephanie Jallifier	France	4:48.99	+51.52
11	12	Yoana Ermenkova; Guide: Yordan Lebanov	Bulgaria	6:04.17	+2:06.70
	8	Valentina Nevidimova; Guide: Anatoly Mikhaylenko	Russia	DSQ	

=== Finals ===
==== Semifinal 1 ====
Rank	Bib	Name	Country	Time	Difference
1	1	Mikhalina Lysova; Guide: Alexey Ivanov	Russia	4:14.4	
2	4	Lioubov Vasilieva; Guide: Natalia Yakimova	Russia	4:14.5	+0.1
3	5	Robbi Weldon; Guide: Brian Berry	Canada	4:23.8	+9.4
4	8	Courtney Knight; Guide: Andrea Bundon	Canada	4:49.6	+35.2

==== Semifinal 2 ====
Rank	Bib	Name	Country	Time	Difference
1	2	Verena Bentele; Guide: Thomas Friedrich	Germany	4:25.8	
2	3	Tatiana Ilyuchenko; Guide: Valery Koshkin	Russia	4:38.4	+12.6
3	7	Oksana Shyshkova; Guide: Dmytro Artomin	Ukraine	4:42.3	+16.5
4	6	Yurie Kanuma; Guide: Norio Odaira	Japan	4:43.7	+17.9

==== Final ====
Rank	Bib	Name	Country	Time	Difference
1st place, gold medalist(s)	2	Verena Bentele; Guide: Thomas Friedrich	Germany	4:14.2	
2nd place, silver medalist(s)	1	Mikhalina Lysova; Guide: Alexey Ivanov	Russia	4:44.2	+30.0
3rd place, bronze medalist(s)	4	Lioubov Vasilieva; Guide: Natalia Yakimova	Russia	4:54.4	+40.2
4	3	Tatiana Ilyuchenko; Guide: Valery Koshkin	Russia	4:58.0	+43.8

== Sitting ==
=== Qualification ===
Rank	Bib	Name	Country	Time	Difference
1	11	Mariann Vestbostad	Norway	2:36.38	
2	1	Francesca Porcellato	Italy	2:36.42	+0.04
3	8	Andrea Eskau	Germany	2:38.35	+1.97
4	2	Olena Iurkovska	Ukraine	2:39.89	+3.51
5	4	Lyudmyla Pavlenko	Ukraine	2:40.94	+4.56
6	5	Liudmila Vauchok	Belarus	2:41.03	+4.65
7	7	Irina Polyakova	Russia	2:41.09	+4.71
8	9	Monica Bascio	United States	2:43.73	+7.35
9	12	Maria Iovleva	Russia	2:45.43	+9.05
10	3	Colette Bourgonje	Canada	2:46.44	+10.06
11	13	Marianne Maiboll	Denmark	2:47.87	+11.49
12	10	Tetyana Tymoshchenko	Ukraine	2:54.80	+18.42
13	6	Nadiia Stefurak	Ukraine	2:56.42	+20.04
14	14	Svetlana Yaroshevich	Russia	3:36.46	+1:00.08
15	15	Vo-Ra-Mi Seo	South Korea	3:46.18	+1:09.80

=== Finals ===
==== Semifinal 1 ====
Rank	Bib	Name	Country	Time	Difference
1	4	Olena Iurkovska	Ukraine	2:43.8	
2	5	Lyudmyla Pavlenko	Ukraine	2:46.5	+2.7
3	1	Mariann Vestbostad	Norway	2:50.4	+6.6
4	8	Monica Bascio	United States	2:56.9	+13.1

==== Semifinal 2 ====
Rank	Bib	Name	Country	Time	Difference
1	2	Francesca Porcellato	Italy	2:55.5	
2	6	Liudmila Vauchok	Belarus	2:57.5	+2.0
3	3	Andrea Eskau	Germany	2:58.7	+3.2
4	7	Irina Polyakova	Russia	3:02.7	+7.2

==== Final ====
Rank	Bib	Name	Country	Time	Difference
1st place, gold medalist(s)	2	Francesca Porcellato	Italy	2:58.5	
2nd place, silver medalist(s)	4	Olena Iurkovska	Ukraine	3:00.0	+1.5
3rd place, bronze medalist(s)	6	Liudmila Vauchok	Belarus	3:01.9	+3.4
4	5	Lyudmyla Pavlenko	Ukraine	3:02.3	+3.8

== Standing ==
=== Qualification ===
Rank	Bib	Name	Country	Time	Difference
1	14	Shoko Ota	Japan	4:01.58	
2	5	Iuliia Batenkova	Ukraine	4:06.11	+4.53
3	1	Anna Burmistrova	Russia	4:07.53	+5.95
4	3	Maija Loytynoja	Finland	4:16.90	+15.32
5	13	Larysa Varona	Belarus	4:22.55	+20.97
6	6	Oleksandra Kononova	Ukraine	4:25.27	+23.69
7	15	Stina Sellin	Sweden	4:26.66	+25.08
8	16	Peng Yuanyuan	China	4:31.38	+29.80
9	12	Jody Barber	Canada	4:40.52	+38.94
10	4	Katarzyna Rogowiec	Poland	4:40.90	+39.32
11	7	Momoko Dekijima	Japan	4:46.82	+45.24
12	9	Mary Benson	Canada	4:50.36	+48.78
13	18	Kelly Underkofler	United States	4:51.17	+49.61
14	2	Chiara Delvittori-Valnegri	Switzerland	4:53.93	+52.35
15	10	Anna Mayer	Poland	5:00.79	+59.21
16	11	Paola Protopapa	Italy	5:05.75	+1:04.17
17	8	Pamela Novaglio	Italy	5:07.89	+1:06.31
18	19	Geng Zhaojing	China	6:35.25	+2:33.67
	17	Alena Gorbunova	Russia	DNS	

=== Finals ===
==== Semifinal 1 ====
Rank	Bib	Name	Country	Time	Difference
1	1	Shoko Ota	Japan	4:25.1	
2	5	Larysa Varona	Belarus	4:36.0	+10.9
3	4	Maija Loytynoja	Finland	4:40.7	+15.6
4	8	Peng Yuanyuan	China	4:47.1	+22.0

==== Semifinal 2 ====
Rank	Bib	Name	Country	Time	Difference
1	3	Anna Burmistrova	Russia	4:18.0	
2	6	Oleksandra Kononova	Ukraine	4:20.6	+2.6
3	2	Iuliia Batenkova	Ukraine	4:21.6	+3.6
4	7	Stina Sellin	Sweden	4:56.9	+38.9

==== Final ====
Rank	Bib	Name	Country	Time	Difference
1st place, gold medalist(s)	6	Oleksandra Kononova	Ukraine	4:21.4	
2nd place, silver medalist(s)	1	Shoko Ota	Japan	4:26.8	+5.4
3rd place, bronze medalist(s)	3	Anna Burmistrova	Russia	4:31.3	+9.9
4	5	Larysa Varona	Belarus	4:34.5	+13.1

== See also ==
- Cross-country skiing at the 2010 Winter Olympics – Women's sprint
