= 2011 IPC Biathlon and Cross-Country Skiing World Championships – Women's long distance =

The women's 10 km and 12.5 km long distance competitions in biathlon of the 2011 IPC Biathlon and Cross-Country Skiing World Championships were held on April 10, 2011. https://athletes-news-live.blogspot.com/2011/11/women-10km-cross-country-skiing-2011.html%5B%5D

== Medals ==
Class	Gold	Silver	Bronze
Sitting	Andrea Eskau; Germany	Olena Iurkovska; Ukraine	Lyudmyla Pavlenko; Ukraine
Standing	Oleksandra Kononova; Ukraine	Katarzyna Rogowiec; Poland	Maija Loytynoja; Finland
Visually impaired	Mikhalina Lysova; Guide: Alexey Ivanov; Russia	Oksana Shyshkova; Guide: Volodymyr Ivanov; Ukraine	Tatiana Ilyuchenko; Guide: Valery Koshkin; Russia

== Results ==
=== Sitting ===
The women's 10 km, sitting. Skiers compete on a sitski.

==== Final ====
Rank	Bib	Name	Country	Penalties (P+P+P+P)	Time (calculated)	Deficit
1st place, gold medalist(s)	27	Andrea Eskau	Germany	0+0+0+1	38:27.4	
2nd place, silver medalist(s)	29	Olena Iurkovska	Ukraine	0+1+0+1	39:11.1	
3rd place, bronze medalist(s)	28	Lyudmyla Pavlenko	Ukraine	0+1+0+1	40:23.8	
4	25	Marta Zaynullina	Russia	0+1+2+1	45:02.9	
5	26	Irina Polyakova	Russia	2+1+3+1	46:05.0	
6	24	Svetlana Yaroshevich	Russia	0+0+1+2	46:57.5	
7	22	Anja Wicker	Germany	3+0+3+2	47:39.0	
8	21	Bohdana Karavanska	Ukraine	0+2+1+1	50:08.7	
	23	Maria Iovleva	Russia		DNS	

=== Standing ===
The women's 12.5 km, standing.

==== Final ====
Rank	Bib	Name	Country	Penalties (P+P+P+P)	Time (calculated)	Deficit
1st place, gold medalist(s)	58	Oleksandra Kononova	Ukraine	1+0+1+1	49:43.3	
2nd place, silver medalist(s)	54	Katarzyna Rogowiec	Poland	2+0+2+0	49:56.7	
3rd place, bronze medalist(s)	56	Maija Loytynoja	Finland	0+0+0+0	50:06.4	
4	55	Iuliia Batenkova	Ukraine	1+1+0+0	52:06.9	
5	51	Jody Barber	Canada	0+3+0+0	53:47.9	
6	52	Kelly Underkofler	United States	1+0+0+0	58:18.8	
7	53	Arleta Dudziak	Poland	0+3+2+0	1:01:17.2	
	57	Anna Burmistrova	Russia		DNS	

=== Visually impaired ===
In the women's 12.5 km, visually impaired, skiers with a visual impairment compete with a sighted guide. Dual medals are rewarded.

==== Final ====
Rank	Bib	Name	Country	Penalties (P+P+P+P)	Time (calculated)	Deficit
1st place, gold medalist(s)	87	Mikhalina Lysova; Guide: Alexey Ivanov	Russia	1+1+0+0	50:21.3	
2nd place, silver medalist(s)	83	Oksana Shyshkova; Guide: Volodymyr Ivanov	Ukraine	1+0+0+0	52:22.2	
3rd place, bronze medalist(s)	86	Tatiana Ilyuchenko; Guide: Valery Koshkin	Russia	0+0+1+2	53:10.1	
4	84	Elvira Kalabina; Guide: Sergey Syniakin	Russia	1+1+0+0	54:31.4	
5	88	Elena Remizova; Guide: Natalia Yakimova	Russia	3+1+2+2	56:54.7	
6	82	Yadviha Skorabahataya; Guide: Vasili Haurukovich	Belarus	2+1+1+1	57:03.4	
7	81	Valentina Nevidimova; Guide: Alexander Maltsev	Russia	1+3+0+0	58:26.0	
8	85	Liubov Vasilyeva; Guide: Tatiana Maltseva	Russia	1+0+2+2	59:57.6	
