= Cross-country skiing at the 2010 Winter Paralympics – Women's 5 km Classic =

Women's 5 km Classic at the X Paralympic Winter Games
- Paralympic cross-country skiing
- Venue: Whistler Olympic Park
- Dates: March 18

The Women's 5 km Classic competition of the Vancouver 2010 Paralympics is held at Whistler Olympic Park in Whistler, British Columbia. The competition is scheduled for Thursday, March 18.

== Visually impaired ==
In the cross-country skiing 5 km Classic visually impaired, the athlete with a visual impairment has a sighted guide. The two skiers are considered a team, and dual medals are awarded.

Rank	Bib	Name	Country	Time	Difference
1st place, gold medalist(s)	11	Verena Bentele; Guide: Thomas Friedrich	Germany	15:08.8	
2nd place, silver medalist(s)	9	Mikhalina Lysova; Guide: Alexey Ivanov	Russia	16:00.3	+51.5
3rd place, bronze medalist(s)	10	Tatiana Ilyuchenko; Guide: Valery Koshkin	Russia	17:18.4	+2:09.6
4	12	Lioubov Vasilieva; Guide: Natalia Yakimova	Russia	17:25.4	+2:16.6
5	4	Yadviha Skorabahataya; Guide: Vasili Haurukovich	Belarus	17:34.8	+2:26.0
6	8	Robbi Weldon; Guide: Brian Berry	Canada	17:40.9	+2:32.1
7	13	Oksana Shyshkova; Guide: Dmytro Artomin	Ukraine	17:44.9	+2:36.1
8	5	Yurie Kanuma; Guide: Norio Odaira	Japan	18:32.9	+3:24.1
9	6	Nathalie Morin; Guide: Stephanie Jallifier	France	19:16.0	+4:07.2
10	3	Valentina Nevidimova; Guide: Anatoly Mikhaylenko	Russia	19:45.6	+4:36.8
11	7	Courtney Knight; Guide: Andrea Bundon	Canada	20:12.7	+5:03.9
12	1	Margarita Gorbounova; Guide: Robert D'Arras	Canada	20:16.5	+5:07.7
13	2	Yoana Ermenkova; Guide: Iskra Olyanova	Bulgaria	27:58.4	+12:49.6

== Sitting ==
Rank	Bib	Name	Country	Time	Difference
1st place, gold medalist(s)	15	Liudmila Vauchok	Belarus	14:56.6	
2nd place, silver medalist(s)	1	Andrea Eskau	Germany	15:11.4	+15.8
3rd place, bronze medalist(s)	16	Colette Bourgonje	Canada	15:16.4	+19.8
4	12	Olena Iurkovska	Ukraine	15:19.7	+23.1
5	14	Lyudmyla Pavlenko	Ukraine	15:23.9	+27.3
6	13	Francesca Porcellato	Italy	15:25.3	+28.7
7	9	Maria Iovleva	Russia	15:47.8	+1:02.2
8	8	Mariann Vestbostad	Norway	15:53.9	+1:08.3
9	11	Irina Polyakova	Russia	16:26.1	+1:20.5
10	5	Monica Bascio	United States	16:32.4	+1:26.8
11	7	Nadiia Stefurak	Ukraine	16:45.9	+1:40.3
12	10	Tetyana Tymoshchenko	Ukraine	17:29.3	+2:32.7
13	6	Marianne Maiboll	Denmark	17:35.2	+2:39.6
14	4	Vo-Ra-Mi Seo	South Korea	21:46.4	+6:50.8
15	3	Svetlana Yaroshevich	Russia	23:42.3	+8:36.7
	2	Svitlana Tryfonova	Ukraine	DNS	

== Standing ==
Rank	Bib	Name	Country	Time	Difference
1st place, gold medalist(s)	14	Oleksandra Kononova	Ukraine	16:01.3	
2nd place, silver medalist(s)	18	Iuliia Batenkova	Ukraine	16:03.7	+2.4
3rd place, bronze medalist(s)	7	Larysa Varona	Belarus	17:38.2	+1:36.9
4	5	Stina Sellin	Sweden	17:54.7	+1:53.4
5	11	Peng Yuanyuan	China	17:57.8	+1:56.5
6	6	Jody Barber	Canada	18:00.4	+1:59.1
7	13	Chiara Devittori-Valnegri	Switzerland	18:05.6	+2:04.3
8	4	Alena Gorbunova	Russia	18:06.2	+2:04.9
9	15	Maija Loytynoja	Finland	18:27.7	+2:26.4
10	8	Kelly Underkofler	United States	18:37.2	+2:35.9
11	9	Shoko Ota	Japan	18:39.6	+2:38.3
12	16	Katarzyna Rogowiec	Poland	19:01.2	+2:59.9
13	12	Paola Protopapa	Italy	20:10.8	+4:09.5
14	1	Mary Benson	Canada	20:12.4	+4:11.1
15	10	Arleta Dudziak	Poland	20:43.8	+4:42.5
16	3	Anna Mayer	Poland	20:52.3	+4:51.0
	2	Zhaojing Geng	China	DNF	
	17	Anna Burmistrova	Russia	DSQ	
