= 2011 IPC Biathlon and Cross-Country Skiing World Championships – Women's 10 and 15 kilometre classical =

The Women's long distance events in cross-country skiing, 15 km classical for category standing and visually impaired and 10 km classical for sitting, were held on April 4 and 5 as part of the 2011 IPC Biathlon and Cross-Country Skiing World Championships.

== Medals ==
Class	Gold	Silver	Bronze
Sitting	Colette Bourgonje; Canada	Liudmila Vauchok; Belarus	Andrea Eskau; Germany
Standing	Oleksandra Kononova; Ukraine	Iuliia Batenkova; Ukraine	Katarzyna Rogowiec; Poland
Visually impaired	Elena Remizova; Guide: Natalia Yakomova; Russia	Mikhalina Lysova; Guide: Alexey Ivanov; Russia	Tatiana Ilyuchenko; Guide: Valery Koshkin; Russia

== Results ==
=== Sitting ===
April 5

Rank	Bib	Athlete	Country	Real time	Deficit	Class	%	Time (calculated)
1st place, gold medalist(s)	22	Colette Bourgonje	Canada	31:19.1	0.0	LW10	86	26:56.0
2nd place, silver medalist(s)	26	Liudmila Vauchok	Belarus	28:49.5	+10.4	LW11	94	27:05.7
3rd place, bronze medalist(s)	24	Andrea Eskau	Germany	29:36.2	+57.1	LW11	94	27:49.6
4	25	Lyudmyla Pavlenko	Ukraine	28:42.2	+1:13.2	LW11.5	98	28:07.8
5	27	Mariann Marthinsen	Norway	28:53.1	+1:57.1	LW12	100	28:53.1
6	23	Bohdana Karavanska	Ukraine	32:42.8	+5:46.8	LW12	100	32:42.8
7	21	Svetlana Yaroshevich	Russia	39:27.6	+8:08.5	LW10	86	33:56.1

=== Standing ===
April 4

Rank	Bib	Athlete	Country	Real time	Deficit	Class	%	Time (calculated)
1st place, gold medalist(s)	44	Oleksandra Kononova	Ukraine	55:07.7	0.0	LW8	92	50:43.1
2nd place, silver medalist(s)	41	Iuliia Batenkova	Ukraine	57:17.7	+1:33.6	LW6	91	52:08.3
3rd place, bronze medalist(s)	46	Katarzyna Rogowiec	Poland	1:06:27.4	+2:15.4	LW5/7	79	52:30.0
4	45	Jody Barber	Canada	1:02:23.9	+7:16.2	LW8	92	57:24.4
5	47	Maija Loytynoja	Finland	1:03:25.0	+8:17.3	LW8	92	58:20.6
6	42	Arleta Dudziak	Poland	1:09:08.8	+14:01.1	LW8	92	1:03:36.9
	43	Larysa Varona	Belarus	DNF		LW8	92	
	48	Anna Burmistrova	Russia	DNS		LW8	92	

=== Visually impaired ===
April 4

Rank	Bib	Athlete	Country	Real time	Deficit	Class	%	Time (calculated)
1st place, gold medalist(s)	55	Elena Remizova; Guide: Natalia Yakimova	Russia	48:42.6	0.0	B2	98	47:44.1
2nd place, silver medalist(s)	57	Mikhalina Lysova; Guide: Alexey Ivanov	Russia	48:30.7	+46.6	B3	100	48:30.7
3rd place, bronze medalist(s)	58	Tatiana Ilyuchenko; Guide: Valery Koshkin	Russia	50:44.1	+3:00.0	B3	100	50:44.1
4	54	Valentina Nevidimova; Guide: Alexander Maltsev	Russia	59:44.5	+4:52.4	B1	87	51:58.5
5	51	Elvira Kalabina; Guide: Sergey Syniakin	Russia	53:31.4	+5:47.3	B3	100	53:31.4
6	56	Liubov Vasilyeva; Guide: Tatiana Maltseva	Russia	54:38.7	+5:56.1	B2	98	53:33.1
7	52	Iuliia Budaleeva; Guide: Tatiana Polovnikova	Russia	1:01:17.3	+12:34.7	B2	98	1:00:03.8
	53	Yadviha Skorabahataya; Guide: Vasili Haurukovich	Belarus	DNF		B2	98	
