= Cross-country skiing at the 2010 Winter Paralympics – Women's 15 km Free =

Women's 15 km Free at the X Paralympic Winter Games
- Paralympic cross-country skiing
- Venue: Whistler Olympic Park
- Dates: March 14; March 15

The women's 15 km free competition of the Vancouver 2010 Paralympics is held at Whistler Olympic Park in Whistler, British Columbia. The competition took place on Sunday, March 14 and Monday, March 15.

== Medal summary ==
=== Medal table ===
Rank	Nation	Gold	Silver	Bronze	Total
1	Russia (RUS)	1	1	0	2
2	Belarus (BLR)	1	0	1	2
3	Germany (GER)	1	0	0	1
4	Ukraine (UKR)	0	1	1	2
5	Canada (CAN)	0	1	0	1
6	Poland (POL)	0	0	1	1
Totals (6 entries)		3	3	3	9

=== Medalists ===
Games	Gold	Silver	Bronze
15 km Free – visually impaired	Germany (GER); Verena Bentele; Guide: Thomas Friedrich	Russia (RUS); Lioubov Vasilieva; Guide: Natalia Yakimova	Belarus (BLR); Yadviha Skorabahataya; Guide: Vasili Haurukovich
10 km – Sitting	Belarus (BLR); Liudmila Vauchok	Canada (CAN); Colette Bourgonje	Ukraine (UKR); Olena Iurkovska
15 km Free – Standing	Russia (RUS); Anna Burmistrova	Ukraine (UKR); Iuliia Batenkova	Poland (POL); Katarzyna Rogowiec

== Visually impaired ==
In the cross-country skiing 15 km Free visually impaired, the athlete with a visual impairment has a sighted guide. The two skiers are considered a team, and dual medals are awarded.

Rank	Bib	Name	Country	Time	Difference
1st place, gold medalist(s)	8	Verena Bentele; Guide: Thomas Friedrich	Germany	45:11.1	
2nd place, silver medalist(s)	7	Lioubov Vasilieva; Guide: Natalia Yakimova	Russia	48:34.1	+3:23.0
3rd place, bronze medalist(s)	4	Yadviha Skorabahataya; Guide: Vasili Haurukovich	Belarus	49:19.3	+4:08.2
4	9	Tatiana Ilyuchenko; Guide: Valery Koshkin	Russia	50:50.9	+5:39.8
5	5	Robbi Weldon; Guide: Brian Berry	Canada	53:36.9	+8:25.8
6	3	Nathalie Morin; Guide: Stephanie Jallifier	France	54:42.1	+9:31.0
7	2	Margarita Gorbounova; Guide: Robert D'Arras	Canada	1:01:59.1	+16:48.0
	6	Mikhalina Lysova	Russia	DNF	
	1	Courtney Knight	Canada	DNS	

== Sitting (10 km) ==
Rank	Bib	Name	Country	Time	Difference
1st place, gold medalist(s)	9	Liudmila Vauchok	Belarus	30:52.9	
2nd place, silver medalist(s)	10	Colette Bourgonje	Canada	31:49.8	+56.9
3rd place, bronze medalist(s)	11	Olena Iurkovska	Ukraine	32:43.5	+1:50.6
4	6	Svitlana Tryfonova	Ukraine	32:50.0	+1:57.1
5	8	Mariann Vestbostad	Norway	33:27.8	+2:34.9
6	7	Maria Iovleva	Russia	33:29.8	+2:36.9
7	12	Lyudmyla Pavlenko	Ukraine	33:30.1	+2:37.2
8	4	Andrea Eskau	Germany	33:46.0	+2:53.1
9	5	Monica Bascio	United States	34:33.9	+3:41.0
10	1	Marianne Maiboll	Denmark	35:36.0	+4:43.1
11	2	Svetlana Yaroshevich	Russia	46:36.1	+15:43.2
	3	Vo-Ra-Mi Seo	South Korea	DNF	

== Standing ==
Rank	Bib	Name	Country	Time	Difference
1st place, gold medalist(s)	11	Anna Burmistrova	Russia	49:16.3	
2nd place, silver medalist(s)	7	Iuliia Batenkova	Ukraine	49:23.5	+7.2
3rd place, bronze medalist(s)	8	Katarzyna Rogowiec	Poland	51:04.1	+1:47.8
4	10	Oleksandra Kononova	Ukraine	51:29.5	+2:06.0
5	9	Chiara Devittori-Valnegri	Switzerland	52:58.8	+3:42.5
6	3	Jody Barber	Canada	55:37.0	+6:20.7
7	6	Peng Yuanyuan	China	55:43.3	+6:27.0
8	4	Kelly Underkofler	United States	58:19.6	+9:03.3
9	2	Alena Gorbunova	Russia	58:43.7	+9:27.4
10	1	Stina Sellin	Sweden	59:01.8	+9:45.5
	5	Mary Benson	Canada	DNF	
