= Biathlon at the 2010 Winter Paralympics – Women's individual =

Women's Individual at the X Paralympic Winter Games
- Paralympic biathlon
- Venue: Whistler Olympic Park
- Dates: March 17

The Women's individual competition of the Vancouver 2010 Paralympics is held at Whistler Olympic Park in Whistler, British Columbia. The competition is scheduled for Wednesday, March 17.

== 12.5 km Visually Impaired ==
In the biathlon 12.5 km visually impaired, the athlete with a visual impairment has a sighted guide. The two skiers are considered a team, and dual medals are awarded.

Rank	Bib	Name	Country	Time	Difference
1st place, gold medalist(s)	8	Verena Bentele; Guide: Thomas Friedrich	Germany	43:57.3	
2nd place, silver medalist(s)	7	Lioubov Vasilieva; Guide: Natalia Yakimova	Russia	46:59.4	+3:02.1
3rd place, bronze medalist(s)	9	Mikhalina Lysova; Guide: Alexey Ivanov	Russia	47:59.1	+4:01.8
4	3	Yadviha Skorabahataya; Guide: Vasili Haurukovich	Belarus	49:00.2	+5:02.9
5	2	Tatiana Ilyuchenko; Guide: Valery Koshkin	Russia	50:05.1	+6:07.8
6	6	Oksana Shyshkova; Guide: Dmytro Artomin	Ukraine	51:42.7	+7:45.4
7	1	Anne-Mette Bredahl; Guide: Monica Berglund	Denmark	53:23.4	+9:25.7
8	4	Nathalie Morin; Guide: Stephanie Jallifier	France	56:15.1	+12:17.8
9	5	Robbi Weldon; Guide: Brian Berry	Canada	59:58.0	+16:00.7

== 10 km Sitting ==
Rank	Bib	Name	Country	Time	Difference
1st place, gold medalist(s)	6	Maria Iovleva	Russia	38:46.6	
2nd place, silver medalist(s)	9	Olena Iurkovska	Ukraine	39:07.8	+21.2
3rd place, bronze medalist(s)	2	Andrea Eskau	Germany	39:54.2	+1:07.6
4	7	Lyudmyla Pavlenko	Ukraine	41:10.6	+2:24.0
5	1	Irina Polyakova	Russia	41:56.5	+3:09.9
6	3	Nadiia Stefurak	Ukraine	43:52.1	+5:05.5
7	8	Svitlana Tryfonova	Ukraine	45:04.2	+6:17.6
8	5	Tetyana Tymoshchenko	Ukraine	46:26.9	+7:30.3
9	4	Svetlana Yaroshevich	Russia	55:32.1	+16:35.5

== 12.5 km Standing ==
Rank	Bib	Name	Country	Time	Difference
1st place, gold medalist(s)	12	Oleksandra Kononova	Ukraine	46:01.4	
2nd place, silver medalist(s)	10	Anna Burmistrova	Russia	48:04.0	+2:02.6
3rd place, bronze medalist(s)	9	Iuliia Batenkova	Ukraine	48:22.5	+2:21.1
4	6	Katarzyna Rogowiec	Poland	49:21.4	+3:20.0
5	2	Alena Gorbunova	Russia	49:29.4	+3:28.0
6	11	Maija Loytynoja	Finland	50:44.6	+4:43.2
7	8	Jody Barber	Canada	51:06.5	+4:05.1
8	3	Momoko Dedijima	Japan	51:30.2	+5:29.8
9	5	Kelly Underkofler	United States	51:44.1	+5:43.7
10	7	Pamela Novaglio	Italy	52:31.9	+6:30.5
11	4	Shoko Ota	Japan	53:37.8	+7:36.4
12	1	Arleta Dudziak	Poland	56:31.9	+10:30.5

== See also ==
- Biathlon at the 2010 Winter Olympics – Women's individual
