= Cross-country skiing at the 2010 Winter Paralympics – Women's 3 x 2.5 km Relay =

Women's 3 × 2.5 km Relay at the X Paralympic Winter Games
- Paralympic cross-country skiing
- Venue: Whistler Olympic Park
- Dates: March 20

The Women's 3 × 2.5 km Relay competition of the Vancouver 2010 Paralympics was held at Whistler Olympic Park in Whistler, British Columbia. The competition was held Thursday, March 18.

Each team used three skiers with a disability. The relay was an open class event, open for standing, visually impaired and sitting classifications. An athlete with a visual impairment has a sighted guide (class B1, B2, optional for B3). Guides are an integral part of cross-country skiing for athletes with a visual impairment, and are medal contenders.

== Results ==
Rank	Bib	Athletes	Country	Time	Difference
1st place, gold medalist(s)	1	Russia; Maria Iovleva; Mikhalina Lysova; Guide: Alexey Ivanov; Lioubov Vasilieva; Guide: Natalia Yakimova	20:23.2; 7:28.7; 6:27.8 6:26.7		
2nd place, silver medalist(s)	3	Ukraine; Olena Iurkovska; Iuliia Batenkova; Oleksandra Kononova	20:42.7; 7:08.2; 7:09.9; 6:24.6	+19.5	
3rd place, bronze medalist(s)	2	Belarus; Larysa Varona; Liudmila Vauchok; Yadviha Skorabahataya; Guide: Vasili Haurukovich	22:04.2; 7:21.8; 7:52.9; 6:49.5	+1:41.0	
4	6	Canada; Colette Bourgonje; Robbi Weldon; Guide: Brian Berry; Jody Barber	22:21.2; 8:11.6; 7:18.1 6:51.5	+1:58.0	
5	4	Japan; Shoko Ota; Yurie Kanuma; Guide: Norio Odaira; Momoko Dekijima	22:21.5; 7:04.2; 8:20.5 6:56.8	+1:58.3	
6	5	Poland; Anna Mayer; Arleta Dudziak; Katarzyna Rogowiec	24:14.6; 8:08.7; 8:54.5; 7:11.4	+3:51.4	

== See also ==
- Cross-country skiing at the 2010 Winter Olympics – Women's 4 × 5 kilometre relay
