= 2010 Winter Paralympics closing ceremony =

- Part of 2010 Winter Paralympics
- Date: March 21, 2010
- Venue: Whistler Medals Plaza
- Location: Whistler, British Columbia, Canada
- Filmed by: Olympic Broadcasting Services (OBS)

The closing ceremony of the 2010 Winter Paralympics took place on March 21, 2010, beginning at 7:30 pm PDT (02:30 UTC, March 22, 2010) at the outdoor Whistler Medals Plaza in Whistler, British Columbia, Canada.

== Program ==
=== National anthem ===
The Canadian national anthem O Canada was sung in English and French by Ali Milner. 125 skiers skied down Whistler Mountain while she sang.

=== Sequence of events ===
President of VANOC, CEO of Vancouver 2010 Paralympic Winter Games John Furlong delivers his concluding speech, thanking everyone. Winnipeg-born singer Chantal Kreviazuk performs 'Today's A Greatest Day' in honour of the athletes.

The newly elected members of the IPC Athletes Council during the 2010 Winter Paralympics are introduced: Katarzyna Rogowiec of Poland and Eskil Hagen of Norway.

Canadian Inuk throat-singer Tania Tagaq performs as Paralympian Kelly Smith is tossed in the air on a traditional Inuit blanket.

President of International Paralympic Committee Sir Philip Craven awards the 2010 Whang Youn Dai Achievement Award to two Paralympic Athletes: Colette Bourgonje of Canada, Bronze medallist Women's Ski and Takayuki Endo of Japan, Ice Sledge Hockey. The president of IPC, Sir Philip Craven, delivers his speech, thanking the First Host Nations, the volunteers, CEO John Furlong, and the people of Vancouver and Whistler for their support to the Paralympic movement. saying "You've set the X Paralympic Winter Games on fire". He noted the athletes who showed sportsmanship during the games.

He declared the 2010 Winter Paralympics as the "best Paralympic Winter Games".

After his speech, the Paralympic Anthem was played as the Paralympic Flag was lowered.

=== Handover to Sochi 2014 ===
The mayors of Vancouver and Whistler Gregor Robertson and Ken Melamed hand over the Paralympic flag to IPC President Sir Philip Craven who entrusts it to the Mayor of Sochi Anatoly Pakhomov.

The Russian Domicolka choir then sings the Russian National Anthem.

The handover performance features Russian sand artist Artur Kirillov making a sand drawing. A young girl in a wheelchair appearing to the right of the stage draws images in a book, as the sand drawing mirrors them, and five children of Russia's Domisolka children's choir start singing the tune of Tchaikovsky's The Nutcracker. Russian Paralympic swimming champion Olesya Vladykina and Figure Skating Olympic champion Ilya Kulik dance to the tune of Tchaikovsky's Waltz of the Snowflakes.

Russian-Georgian blind singer Diana Gurtskaya performs Sochi 2014's theme song while large balloons bearing the logo of Sochi 2014 and other iconic images of Russia are tossed to the audience. Vancouver actor/dancer, Valin Shinyei (age 8) passed the torch to a Russian counterpart.

== Anthems performed by ==
- (Canada) Ali Milner, Canadian National Anthem
- (International Paralympic Committee) Vancouver Youth Symphony Orchestra, Paralympic Hymn
- (Russia) Russian Domicolka Choir, Russian National Anthem

== Media coverage ==
Live broadcast:

- Canada: CTV

After the host nation's TV broadcaster, CTV, received criticism for initially not planning to air the opening ceremony live and did an about face to air the ceremony live in Vancouver region while broadcasting the ceremony on tape delay in rest of the country, CTV continued to stick to its initial plan of not airing the closing ceremony live. This decision led to more complaints and CTV relented by airing the closing ceremony live across Canada.

== See also ==
- 2010 Winter Olympics closing ceremony
