= Biathlon at the 2010 Winter Paralympics – Women's pursuit =

Women's Pursuit at the X Paralympic Winter Games
- Paralympic biathlon
- Venue: Whistler Olympic Park
- Dates: March 13

The Women's Pursuit competition of the Vancouver 2010 Paralympics is held at Whistler Olympic Park in Whistler, British Columbia. The competition is scheduled for Saturday, March 13.

== 2 x 3 km Visually Impaired ==
In the biathlon 2 x 3 km visually impaired, the athlete with a visual impairment has a sighted guide. The two skiers are considered a team, and dual medals are awarded.

Rank	Bib	Name	Country	Time Qualification	Rank	Time	Difference
1st place, gold medalist(s)	11	Verena Bentele; Guide: Thomas Friedrich	Germany	11:06.10	1 Q	12:51.8	
2nd place, silver medalist(s)	10	Lioubov Vasilieva; Guide: Natalia Yakimova	Russia	11:12.39	2 Q	13:23.4	+31.6
3rd place, bronze medalist(s)	9	Mikhalina Lysova; Guide: Alexey Ivanov	Russia	11:27.38	3 Q	13:40.8	+49.0
4	5	Tatiana Ilyuchenko; Guide: Valery Koshkin	Russia	11:46.25	4 Q	15:05.6	+2:13.8
5	8	Oksana Shyshkova; Guide: Dmytro Artomin	Ukraine	13:39.87	5 Q	16:43.6	+3:51.8
6	1	Robbi Weldon; Guide: Brian Berry	Canada	14:19.65	6 Q	20:34.7	+7:42.9
7	2	Yurie Kanuma; Guide: Norio Odaira	Japan	14:26.51	7		
8	3	Anne-Mette Bredahl; Guide: Monica Berglund	Denmark	14:41.20	8		
9	7	Courtney Knight; Guide: Andrea Bundon	Canada	14:54.97	9		
10	4	Nathalie Morin; Guide: Stephanie Jallifier	France	15:00.95	10		
11	6	Margarita Gorbounova; Guide: Robert D'Arras	Canada	16:11.15	11		

== 2 x 2.4 km Sitting ==
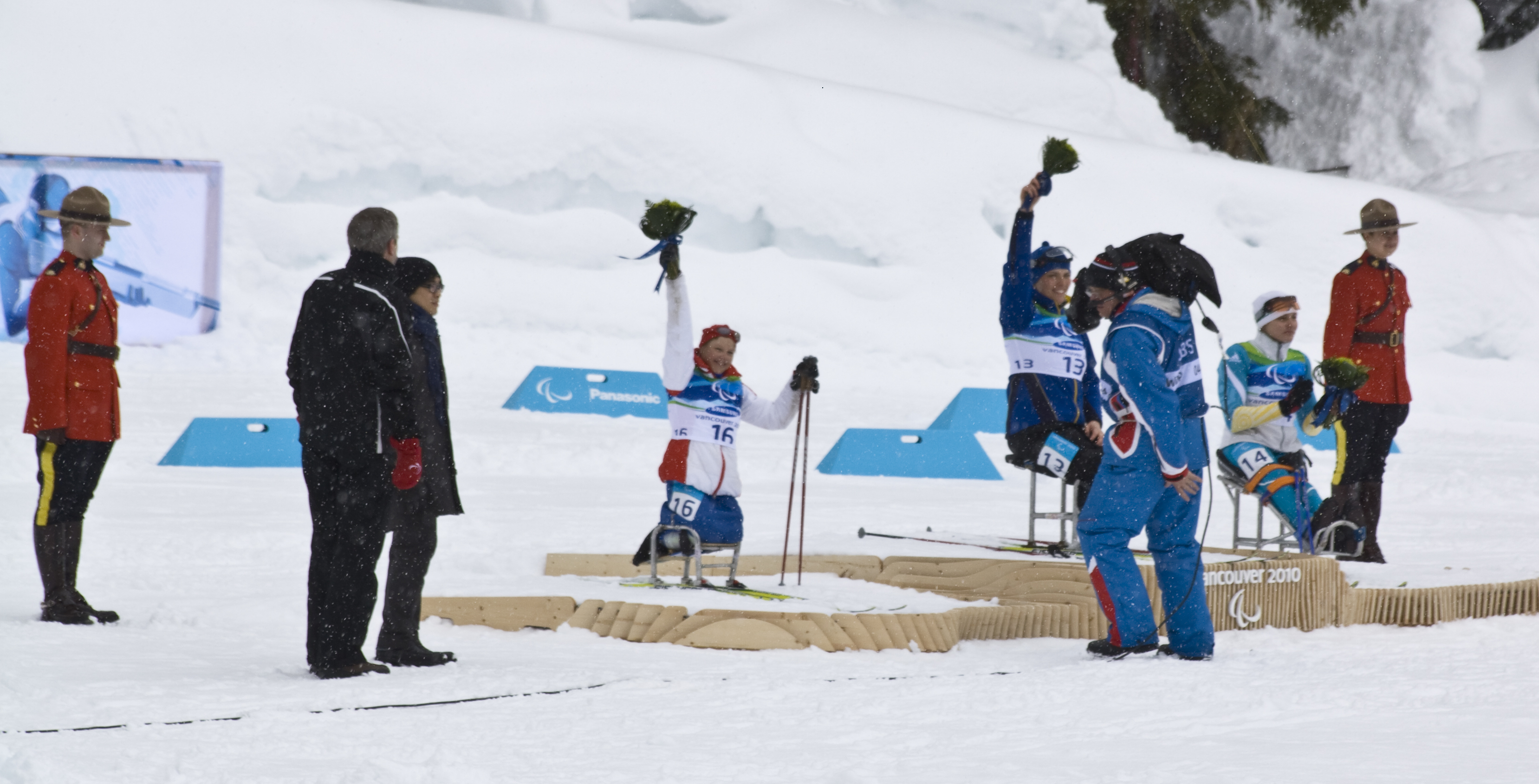
Women's 2.4km Pursuit Sitting - flower ceremony

Rank	Bib	Name	Country	Time Qualification	Rank	Time	Difference
1st place, gold medalist(s)	7	Olena Iurkovska	Ukraine	9:18.53	1 Q	9:55.5	
2nd place, silver medalist(s)	3	Maria Iovleva	Russia	9:52.97	3 Q	10:12.6	+17.1
3rd place, bronze medalist(s)	8	Lyudmyla Pavlenko	Ukraine	9:32.57	2 Q	10:20.7	+25.2
4	5	Irina Polyakova	Russia	10:06.08	4 Q	11:59.3	+2:03.8
5	9	Svitlana Tryfonova	Ukraine	10:19.97	5 Q	13:01.1	+3:05.6
6	2	Andrea Eskau	Germany	11:05.58	6 Q	13:50.5	+3:55.0
7	1	Tetyana Tymoshchenko	Ukraine	13:01.30	7		
8	4	Svetlana Yaroshevich	Russia	14:28.93	8		
9	6	Nadiia Stefurak	Ukraine	14:33.67	9		

== Standing ==
Rank	Bib	Name	Country	Time Qualification	Rank	Time	Difference
1st place, gold medalist(s)	9	Anna Burmistrova	Russia	9:44.78	1 Q	11:24.1	
2nd place, silver medalist(s)	12	Maija Loytynoja	Finland	11:07.63	3 Q	12:59.8	+1:35.7
3rd place, bronze medalist(s)	2	Alena Gorbunova	Russia	10:57.47	2 Q	13:25.1	+2:01.0
4	6	Iuliia Batenkova	Ukraine	11:57.42	7 Q	13:34.5	+2:10.4
5	10	Katarzyna Rogowiec	Poland	11:24.90	4 Q	13:36.3	+2:12.2
6	13	Oleksandra Kononova	Ukraine	12:23.40	10 Q	14:04.6	+2:40.5
7	8	Shoko Ota	Japan	11:54.94	6 Q	14:06.2	+2:42.1
8	5	Pamela Novaglio	Italy	11:36.69	5 Q	14:37.6	+3:13.5
9	11	Kelly Underkofler	United States	12:00.43	8 Q	14:39.0	+3:14.9
10	4	Jody Barber	Canada	12:13.15	9 Q	14:41.2	+3:17.1
11	1	Momoko Dekijima	Japan	12:59.58	11		
12	3	Arleta Dudziak	Poland	14:24.19	12		
13	7	Anna Mayer	Poland	20:57.01	13		

== See also ==
- Biathlon at the 2010 Winter Olympics – Women's pursuit
