= Poland at the 2010 Winter Paralympics =

- IPC code: POL
- NPC: Polish Paralympic Committee
- Website: www.paralympic.org.pl

in Vancouver
- Competitors: 12 in 3 sports
- Flag bearer: Jarosław Rola
- Medals Ranked 20th: Gold 0 Silver 0 Bronze 1 Total 1

Winter Paralympics appearances (overview)
- 1976; 1980; 1984; 1988; 1992; 1994; 1998; 2002; 2006; 2010; 2014; 2018; 2022; 2026

Poland sent 12 competitors to compete in three disciplines at the 2010 Winter Paralympics in Vancouver, Canada.

== Medalists ==
=== Bronze ===
- Katarzyna Rogowiec - Cross-country skiing, 15 km Individual Freestyle

== Alpine skiing ==
Athlete	Event	Final					
Athlete	Event	Run 1	Rank	Run 2	Rank	Calculated Time	Rank
Michal Klos	Slalom standing	1:02.83	33	1:05.42	33	2:08.25	23
Michal Klos	Giant slalom standing	1:24.29	31	1:25.73	30	2:50.02	30
Maciej Krezel	Slalom visually impaired	55.16	12	1:01.65	9	1:56.81	8
Maciej Krezel	Giant slalom visually Impaired	1:28.69	13	1:28.97	8	2:57.66	9
Jarosław Rola	Slalom sitting	DSQ		DNS		DNF	
Jarosław Rola	Giant slalom sitting	1:30.80	22	DSQ		DNF	
Andrzej Szczesny	Combined standing	1:32.14	15	54.25	14	2:26.39	15
Andrzej Szczesny	Giant slalom standing	1:23.36	27	1:22.02	25	2:45.38	25
Andrzej Szczesny	Slalom standing	58.84	25	59.50	26	1:58.34	26
Andrzej Szczesny	Super-G standing	1:35.12	30	—N/a		1:35.12	30
Rafal Szumiec	Slalom sitting	1:05.30	33	1:09.9	25	2:15.20	27
Rafal Szumiec	Giant slalom sitting	DSQ		DNS		DNF	

== Biathlon ==
Athlete	Events	Qualification		Final	
Athlete	Events	Time	Rank	Finish time	Rank
Arleta Dudziak	Standing Pursuit	14:24.19	12	did not advance	
Arleta Dudziak	Standing Individual	—N/a		56:31.9	12
Sylwester Flis	Sitting Pursuit	12:32.18	25	did not advance	
Jan Kolodziej	Standing Pursuit	10:05.62	13	did not advance	
Anna Mayer	Standing Pursuit	20:57.01	13	did not advance	
Katarzyna Rogowiec	Standing Pursuit	11:24.90	4 Q	13:36.3	5
Katarzyna Rogowiec	Standing Individual	—N/a		49:21.4	4
Kamil Rosiek	Sitting Pursuit	9:54.83	15	did not advance	
Kamil Rosiek	Sitting Individual	—N/a		53:22.3	17
Robert Wator	Sitting Pursuit	9:54.47	14	did not advance	
Robert Wator	Sitting Individual	—N/a		51:51.0	14

== Cross-country skiing ==
Athlete	Event	Qualification		Final		
Athlete	Event	Time	Rank	Time	Calculated Time	Rank
Arleta Dudziak	Standing 5 km Sprint Classic	20:43.8	15	did not advance		
Sylwester Flis	Sitting 1 km Sprint Classic	2:27.94	27	did not advance		
Sylwester Flis	Sitting 10 km Sprint Classic	—N/a		DNS		
Jan Kolodziej	Standing 1 km Sprint Classic	3:29.06	10	did not advance		
Anna Mayer	Standing 5 km Sprint Classic	20:52.3	16	did not advance		
Katarzyna Rogowiec	Standing 1 km Sprint Classic	4:40.90	10	did not advance		
Katarzyna Rogowiec	Standing 5 km Sprint Classic	19:01.2	12	did not advance		
Katarzyna Rogowiec	Standing 15 km Free	—N/a			51:04.1	3rd place, bronze medalist(s)
Kamil Rosiek	Sitting 1 km Sprint Classic	2:21.64	16	did not advance		
Kamil Rosiek	Sitting 10 km Sprint Classic	—N/a			30:30.7	23
Kamil Rosiek	Sitting 15 km Sprint Classic	—N/a			45:21.2	20
Robert Wator	Sitting 1 km Sprint Classic	2:30.99	30	did not advance		
Robert Wator	Sitting 10 km Sprint Classic	—N/a			30:15.8	20
Robert Wator	Sitting 15 km Sprint Classic	—N/a			45:25.9	21
Katarzyna Rogowiec; Arleta Dudziak; Anna Mayer	3 x 2.5 km Relay	—N/a			24:14.6	6

== See also ==
- Poland at the 2010 Winter Olympics
- Poland at the Paralympics
