= 2010 Winter Paralympics =

Multi-parasport event in Vancouver and Whistler, Canada

X Paralympic Winter Games
- Location: Vancouver, Canada
- Motto: With Glowing Hearts (French: Des plus brillants exploits)
- Nations: 44
- Athletes: 506
- Events: 64 in 5 sports
- Opening: 12 March 2010
- Closing: 21 March 2010
- Opened by: Governor General Michaëlle Jean
- Closed by: IPC President Philip Craven
- Cauldron: Zachary Beaumont
- Stadium: BC Place Stadium

The 2010 Winter Paralympics (French: Jeux paralympiques d'hiver de 2010), or the tenth Paralympic Winter Games, were held in Vancouver and Whistler, British Columbia, Canada, from March 12 to 21, 2010. The opening ceremony took place in BC Place Stadium in Vancouver and the closing ceremony in Whistler Medals Plaza.

This was the first time Canada hosted the Winter Paralympic Games and second time it hosted the Paralympics – the first was the 1976 Summer Paralympics in Toronto.

On June 7, 2006, Prince Edward, as a member of the Canadian Royal Family and patron of the British Paralympic Association, raised the flag of the Paralympic Games outside Vancouver City Hall.

Brian McKeever of Canada became the first athlete to be named in a Winter Paralympics and Winter Olympics team in the same year, although he did not compete in the Olympic Games. (At the 2010 Winter Olympics, he was scheduled to compete in the men's 50 km cross-country race, but the coach replaced him with a skier who did well at an earlier event.) At the Paralympics, he competed in cross-country skiing and biathlon.

Viviane Forest became the first Paralympian to win a gold in both the Winter and Summer Games, having won the women's downhill for visually impaired. She had previously won gold in the 2000 and 2004 Summer Paralympics for women's goalball. Canadian Lauren Woolstencroft won 5 gold medals in alpine skiing, the most gold medals won by any Canadian Winter Paralympian at a single Games. Also German Verena Bentele won 5 gold medals, in biathlon and cross-country skiing, and with that number they set the gold medal record for the 2010 Games.

== Bidding process ==
As part of a formal agreement between the International Paralympic Committee and the International Olympic Committee first established in 2001, the winner of the bid for the 2010 Winter Olympics was also to host the 2010 Winter Paralympics. Following the second and final round of voting at the 115th IOC Session in Prague, Czech Republic, the right to host the 2010 Winter Olympics and Paralympics were awarded to Vancouver.

2010 Winter Olympics bidding results
City	Nation	Round 1	Round 2
Vancouver	Canada	40	56
Pyeongchang	South Korea	51	53
Salzburg	Austria	16	—

== Development and preparation ==
=== Torch relay ===
The same torch design (silver with Paralympic logo) used for the Olympics was used for the Paralympic Games. On March 3, 2010, the torch began a 10-day journey from Ottawa to Vancouver. The relay involved approximately six hundred runners to carry the torch across ten Canadian cities in three provinces:

- Ottawa – March 3
- Quebec City – March 4
- Toronto, Ontario – March 5
- Esquimalt, BC and Victoria, BC – March 6
- Squamish, BC – March 7
- Whistler, BC – March 8
- Lytton and Hope, BC – March 9
- Vancouver (Riley Park) and Maple Ridge, BC – March 10
- Vancouver (University of British Columbia), BC – March 11
- Vancouver, BC – March 12 (24-hour relay)

=== Venues ===
Venues for the 2010 Winter Paralympics were shared between Vancouver and Whistler, as with the 2010 Winter Olympics.

Competition venues

Venue	Location	Sports	Capacity	Ref.
Doug Mitchell Thunderbird Sports Centre	Vancouver	Ice sledge hockey	7,200	
Vancouver Olympic/Paralympic Centre	Vancouver	Wheelchair curling	6,000	
Whistler Creekside	Whistler	Alpine skiing	7,600	
Whistler Paralympic Park	Whistler	Biathlon, cross-country skiing	6,000	

Non-competition venues

Venue	Location	Purpose	Ref.
BC Place Stadium	Vancouver	Opening ceremonies	
International Broadcast Centre	Vancouver	Media (Broadcaster) Centre	
Vancouver Olympic and Paralympic Village	Vancouver	Paralympic Village	
Whistler Media Centre	Whistler	Media centre	
Whistler Olympic and Paralympic Village	Whistler	Paralympic Village	
Whistler Olympic Medals Plaza	Whistler	Awards and closing ceremonies	

=== Marketing ===
When the mascot, Sumi, an animal guardian spirit with the wings of the Thunderbird and legs of a black bear, was introduced, it was the first time the Olympic and Paralympic mascots were introduced at the same time.

To commemorate the 2010 Vancouver Olympic Games, 17 Canadian coins were issued for general circulation. Two of the circulation coins honour Paralympic sports: wheelchair curling (released on July 11, 2007) and ice sledge hockey (released on March 18, 2010). The circulation quarters omitted a traditional phrase, Dei Gratia Regina, from their obverse side, making them the first godless coins in circulation since 1911.

Specifications

Years	Weight	Diameter/Shape	Composition
2007–present	4.4 g	23.88 mm	94.0% steel, 3.8% copper, 2.2% nickel plating

Details

Date of Issue	Sport	Artist	Mintage
July 11, 2007	Wheelchair curling	Glen Green	22,000,000
March 18, 2010	Ice sledge hockey	Glen Green	22,000,000

== The Games ==
=== Ceremonies ===
With a theme of "One Inspires Many," the opening ceremony featured over 5000 local performers and took place at BC Place. Fifteen-year-old snowboarder Zachary Beaumont, who is an amputee, was the final torchbearer and lit the Paralympic cauldron. The 2-hour live ceremony was produced by Vancouver-based Patrick Roberge Productions Inc.

The closing ceremony occurred outdoors at Whistler Olympic Park and featured a 2014 Winter Paralympics handover segment, which was held in Sochi, Russia. The Paralympic flame was extinguished during the ceremony.

=== Participating nations ===
Forty-four National Paralympic Committees (NPCs) entered athletes at the 2010 Winter Paralympics. This was an increase of five from the 39 represented at the 2006 Winter Paralympics. The number in parentheses indicates the number of participants from each NPC.

- Andorra (2)
- Argentina (2)
- Armenia (2)
- Australia (11)
- Austria (19)
- Belarus (9)
- Belgium (1)
- Bosnia and Herzegovina (1)
- Bulgaria (3)
- Canada (55)
- Chile (2)
- China (7)
- Croatia (4)
- Czech Republic (19)
- Denmark (2)
- Finland (5)
- France (21)
- Germany (20)
- Great Britain (12)
- Greece (2)
- Hungary (2)
- Iceland (1)
- Iran (1)
- Italy (35)
- Japan (42)
- Kazakhstan (1)
- Mexico (2)
- Mongolia (2)
- Netherlands (1)
- New Zealand (2)
- Norway (27)
- Poland (12)
- Romania (1)
- Russia (31)
- Serbia (1)
- Slovakia (13)
- Slovenia (1)
- South Africa (1)
- South Korea (25)
- Spain (5)
- Sweden (26)
- Switzerland (15)
- Ukraine (19)
- United States (50)

A total of 506 athletes participated in the Games. This is an increase from the 476 athletes who participated in 2006.

Argentina and Romania took part in the Winter Paralympic Games for the first time, as did Bosnia and Herzegovina. All three have previously participated in several editions of the Summer Paralympics. Serbia also made its Winter Paralympics début as a distinct NPC, following its split with Montenegro.

Despite the overall increase of delegates and athletes, Latvia, which participated in Turin for the 2006 Winter Paralympics, did not send athletes to Vancouver.

=== Sports ===
Five sports were on the 2010 program:

- Alpine skiing (30) ()
- Biathlon (12) ()
- Cross-country skiing (20) ()
- Ice sledge hockey (1) ()
- Wheelchair curling (1) ()

=== Calendar ===
In the following calendar for the 2010 Winter Paralympic Games, each blue box represents an event competition, such as a qualification round, on that day. The yellow boxes represent days during which gold medal finals for a sport are held.

●	Opening ceremony	Event competitions	●	Event finals	●	Closing ceremony

March 2010	12th Fri	13th Sat	14th Sun	15th Mon	16th Tue	17th Wed	18th Thu	19th Fri	20th Sat	21st Sun	Gold medals
Alpine skiing			● ● ● ●	● ●	● ● ● ●	● ●	● ● ● ● ● ●	● ● ● ● ● ●	● ● ● ● ● ●		30
Biathlon		● ● ● ● ● ●				● ● ● ● ● ●					12
Cross-country skiing			● ●	● ● ● ●			● ● ● ● ● ●		● ●	● ● ● ● ● ●	20
Ice sledge hockey									●		1
Wheelchair curling									●		1
Total gold medals		6	6	6	4	8	12	6	10	6	64
Ceremonies	●									●	

=== Medal count ===
The top ten NPCs by number of gold medals are listed below. The host nation, Canada, is highlighted.

Rank	Nation	Gold	Silver	Bronze	Total
1	Germany (GER)	13	5	6	24
2	Russia (RUS)	12	16	10	38
3	Canada (CAN)*	10	5	4	19
4	Slovakia (SVK)	6	2	3	11
5	Ukraine (UKR)	5	8	6	19
6	United States (USA)	4	5	4	13
7	Austria (AUT)	3	4	4	11
8	Japan (JPN)	3	3	5	11
9	Belarus (BLR)	2	0	7	9
10	France (FRA)	1	4	1	6
Totals (10 entries)		59	52	50	161

=== Podium sweeps ===
Date	Sport	Event	NOC	Gold	Silver	Bronze	Ref
17 March	Biathlon	Men's 12.5km Sitting	Russia	Irek Zaripov	Vladimir Kiselev	Roman Petushkov	
21 March	Cross-country skiing	Men's 1 km Sprint Classic Sitting	Russia	Sergey Shilov	Irek Zaripov	Vladimir Kiselev	

== Broadcasters ==
In Canada, the games were broadcast by Canada's Olympic Broadcast Media Consortium, a joint venture between CTVglobemedia and Rogers Media. The networks aired a greater amount of coverage than what had been shown in previous years, a total of 50 hours of coverage. Coverage included including a daily 90-minute highlight program, and live coverage of select sledge hockey matches (games involving Canada, plus the gold medal game) on CTV. The opening ceremony was broadcast live on CTV's Vancouver station CIVT-TV, followed by an encore aired nationally on CTV and Réseau Info Sports the following afternoon. While not originally planned, CTV and RDS also aired live coverage of the closing ceremony.

The games were aired on Universal Sports in the United States.

Paralympic Sport TV (paralympicsport.tv), the Internet TV channel of the International Paralympic Committee (IPC), offered international free online live and recorded coverage of the games, every day from 9:00 to 22:30 PST.

In New Zealand, SKY TV broadcast one hour of highlights each day, and full coverage of New Zealand athletes.

In the United Kingdom, BBC broadcast the Games, but only through the red button and online.

In Europe, Eurosport broadcast live the medal events in biathlon, alpine and cross-country skiing.

In France, France Télévisions provided live coverage on its website.

In Italy, Sky Sport provided record coverage with all games live on five dedicated HD channels.

In Australia, ABC1 broadcast the games.

In Norway, NRK broadcast the games. 30 hours of the Games were broadcast live. NRK-sport were critical to parts of the TV production from Vancouver, an issue they've notified to the EBU. Issues such as showing biathlon without showing the shooting, and in cross-country skiing there were numerous panorama shots of the same mountain area with skiers in the distance, making it hard to follow the progress of the competition. NRK were far more pleased with the production of the ice sledge hockey and wheelchair curling events, which they felt reached the same level as the Olympic Games.

=== Paralympic media awards ===
New Zealand's Sky Sport won the best broadcast award for their coverage of the Games. Gary Kingston writing for the Vancouver Sun took the best written category. While Jeff Crow won the best photography category for his picture of Shannon Dallas.

== Mascots ==
The mascot of the 2010 Winter Paralympics is Sumi, who has the wings of a thunderbird and the legs of a black bear, accompanied by his marmot sidekick, Mukmuk.

== Legacy ==
In the winter sports season following the games, there was a notable increase in winter disability sports participation throughout British Columbia.

== See also ==
- Integrated Security Unit
- Royal Canadian Mint Olympic Coins

Preceded by Turin	Winter Paralympics; Vancouver; X Paralympic Winter Games (2010)	Succeeded by Sochi
