= Oleksandra Kononova =

Ukrainian Para Nordic skier (born 1991)

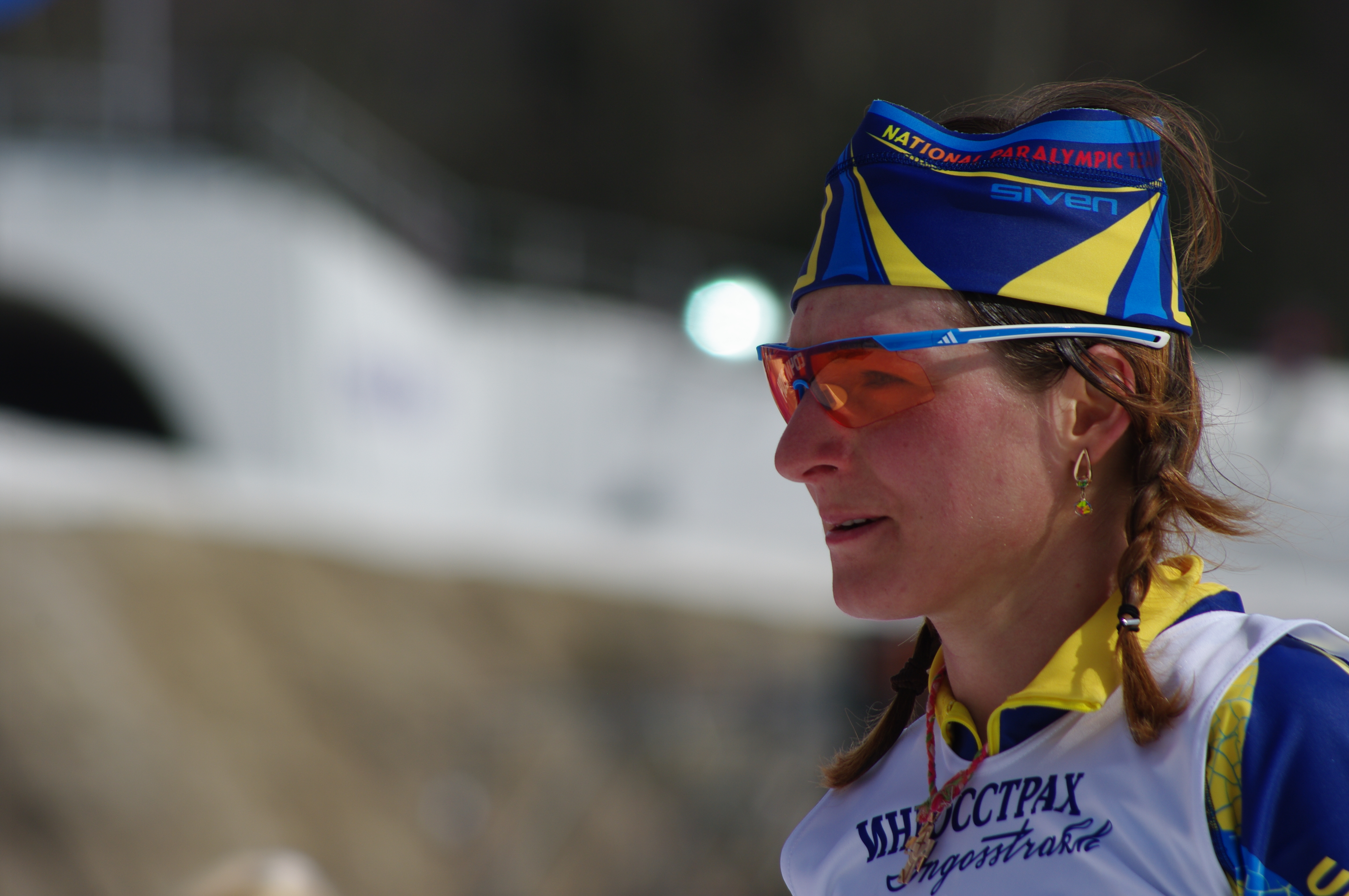
- Oleksandra Kononova in Sochi, 2014

Personal information
- Full name: Oleksandra Mykolaivna Kononova
- Born: 27 February 1991 (age 35) Kyiv region, Ukraine

Sport
- Country: Ukraine
- Sport: Para Nordic skiing (Para cross-country skiing and Para biathlon)
- Disability class: LW8
Medal record
Representing Ukraine
Event	1st	2nd	3rd
Winter Paralympics	5	4	3
World Championships	17	12	7
Total	22	16	10
Winter Paralympics
Women's Para biathlon
Gold medal – first place	2010 Vancouver	12.5 km standing
Gold medal – first place	2014 Sochi	12.5 km standing
Gold medal – first place	2026 Milano Cortina	Sprint standing
Silver medal – second place	2014 Sochi	10 km standing
Silver medal – second place	2022 Beijing	10 km standing
Bronze medal – third place	2026 Milano Cortina	Sprint pursuit standing
Women's Para cross-country skiing
Gold medal – first place	2010 Vancouver	1 km standing
Gold medal – first place	2010 Vancouver	5 km standing
Gold medal – first place	2022 Beijing	10 km standing
Silver medal – second place	2010 Vancouver	3x2.5 km relay, open
Silver medal – second place	2026 Milano Cortina	4 × 2.5 km mixed relay
Bronze medal – third place	2014 Sochi	5 km standing
Bronze medal – third place	2026 Milano Cortina	20 km standing
World Championships
Women's Para biathlon
Gold medal – first place	2009 Vuokatti	12.5 km standing
Gold medal – first place	2011 Khanty-Mansiysk	7.5 km standing
Gold medal – first place	2011 Khanty-Mansiysk	12.5 km standing
Gold medal – first place	2015 Cable	7.5 km standing
Gold medal – first place	2015 Cable	10 km standing
Gold medal – first place	2015 Cable	12.5 km standing
Gold medal – first place	2017 Finsterau	10 km standing
Gold medal – first place	2021 Lillehammer	6 km standing
Silver medal – second place	2013 Sollefteå	12.5 km standing
Silver medal – second place	2017 Finsterau	6 km standing
Silver medal – second place	2019 Prince George	6 km standing
Silver medal – second place	2019 Prince George	12.5 km standing
Silver medal – second place	2021 Lillehammer	12.5 km standing
Bronze medal – third place	2011 Khanty-Mansiysk	3.6 km standing
Bronze medal – third place	2013 Sollefteå	7.5 km standing
Bronze medal – third place	2019 Prince George	10 km standing
Bronze medal – third place	2021 Lillehammer	10 km standing
Women's Para cross-country skiing
Gold medal – first place	2011 Khanty-Mansiysk	1 km standing
Gold medal – first place	2011 Khanty-Mansiysk	15 km standing
Gold medal – first place	2015 Cable	15 km standing
Gold medal – first place	2015 Cable	5 km standing
Gold medal – first place	2015 Cable	1.2 km sprint standing
Gold medal – first place	2017 Finsterau	5 km standing
Gold medal – first place	2017 Finsterau	15 km standing
Gold medal – first place	2017 Finsterau	4x2.5 km mixed relay
Gold medal – first place	2019 Prince George	4x2.5 km mixed relay
Silver medal – second place	2009 Vuokatti	1 km standing
Silver medal – second place	2009 Vuokatti	3x2.5 km relay, open
Silver medal – second place	2011 Khanty-Mansiysk	5 km free – standing
Silver medal – second place	2011 Khanty-Mansiysk	3x2.5km relay, open
Silver medal – second place	2013 Sollefteå	5 km standing
Silver medal – second place	2015 Cable	4x2.5 km mixed relay
Silver medal – second place	2017 Finsterau	1.2 km sprint standing
Bronze medal – third place	2013 Sollefteå	1 km standing
Bronze medal – third place	2013 Sollefteå	5 km free standing
Bronze medal – third place	2019 Prince George	5 km standing

Oleksandra Mykolaivna Kononova (Ukrainian: Олександра Миколаївна Кононова; born 27 February 1991) is a Ukrainian Para cross-country skier and biathlete. She won three medals at the 2010 Paralympics and became the 2010 Ukrainian sports personality of the year.

== Personal life ==
Kononova was born in Brovary in 1991. She had a condition when she was a young child that meant that her right arm did not develop as well as her other arm. Kononova was an orphan brought up by her grandmother. When she was ten she met some youths who were using in-line roller skates. Kononova came from a poor background, she was bullied due to her disability and remembered being unhappy. She found out that the people she had met in the park were not roller skaters but a team training using skates for cross-country skiing. She decided to take up the sport.

== Career ==
Training on skates during the spring and summer seasons she found that her disability did not effect her ability to succeed at skiing and she was achieving national positions by the time she was eighteen. Her first trainer was Anatoliy Zadvineyev.

When Kononova was nineteen she was chosen to travel from her home in Kyiv Oblast to represent her country at the paralympics in Canada. She was part of a Ukrainian team who had been fourth at the last paralympics and who hoped to better their position. Kononova won a gold medal for Ukraine in the standing biathlon at the Paralympic games in Vancouver in 2010. She competed at the games as the reigning world champion. Kononova won the best debut at the games adding to the nineteen medals that Ukraine took in Vancouver.

She won three gold medals and a silver medal at the 2010 Paralympics and became the 2010 Ukrainian sports personality of the year. She won significant prize money from the Ukrainian government and was credited with assisting in changing the Ukrainian's attitudes to disability in general.

Kononova competed at the IPC Nordic Biathlon World Cup in Vuokatti in Finland in 2014. On the final day of the World Cup she was the only non-Russian to claim a gold medal. She was in the Ukrainian biathlon team at the Sochi 2014 Paralympic Winter Games.

She won the gold medal in the women's 6 km standing biathlon event at the 2021 World Para Snow Sports Championships held in Lillehammer, Norway. She also won the bronze medal in the women's 10 km standing biathlon event.
