= Lioubov Vasilieva =

Russian Para cross-country skier and biathlete (born 1967)

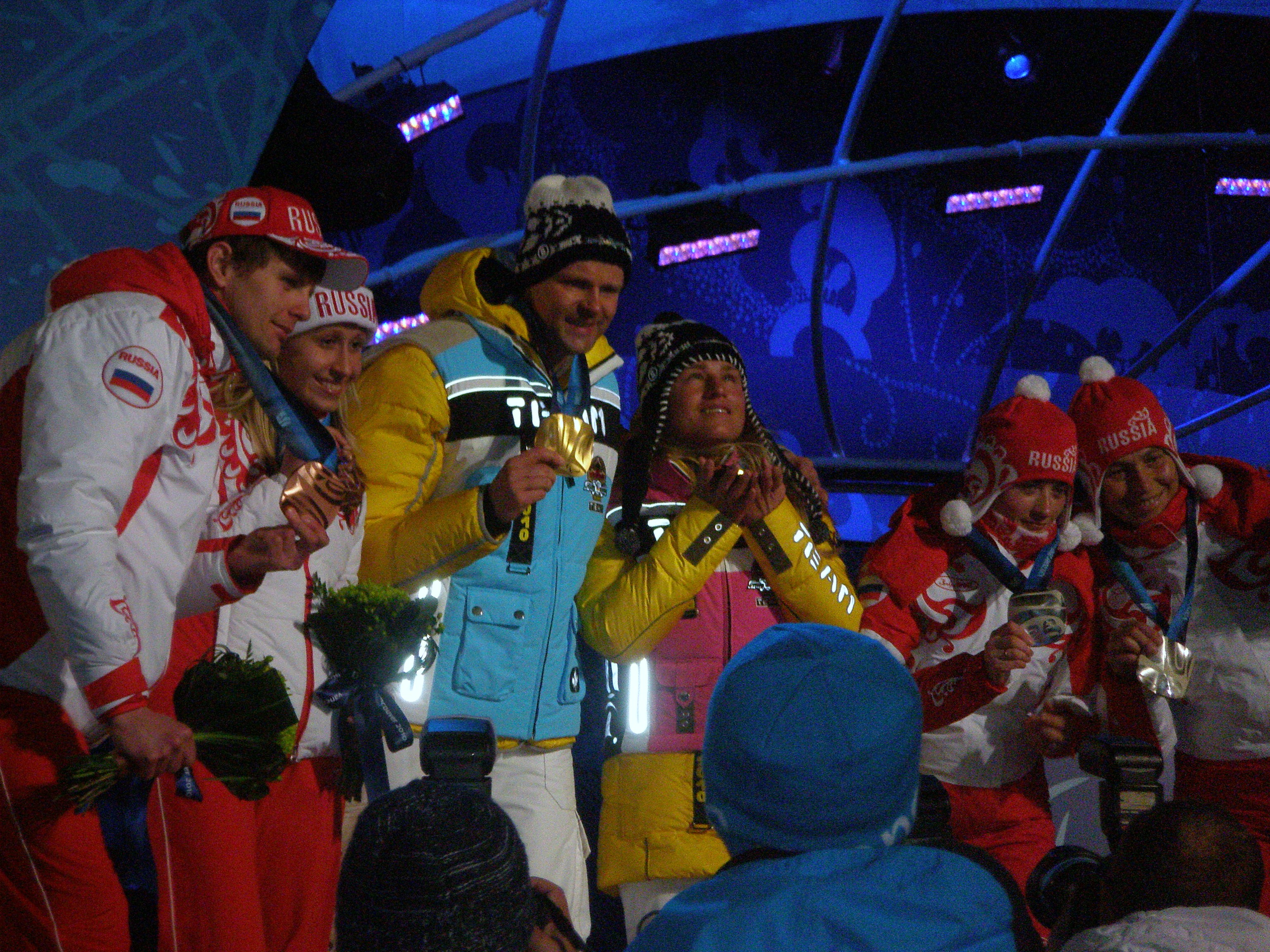
- Medalists at the visually impaired biathlon events during the 2010 Winter Paralympics including Liubov Vasilieva and fellow Russian Para Nordic skier Mikhalina Lysova

Personal information
- Nationality: Russian
- Born: 24 May 1967 (age 59) Sinegorye, Soviet Union
- Years active: 2003 – 2010

Sport
- Country: Russia
- Sport: Para Nordic skiing (Para cross-country skiing and Para biathlon)
- Disability class: B2
- Coached by: Vyacheslav Goldinov
Medal record
Representing Russia
Women's Para cross-country skiing
Winter Paralympics
Gold medal – first place	Turin 2006	10km visually impaired
Gold medal – first place	Turin 2006	15km visually impaired
Gold medal – first place	Turin 2006	3 × 2.5 km relay open
Gold medal – first place	Vancouver 2010	3 x 2.5 km relay open
Silver medal – second place	Vancouver 2010	15km visually impaired
Women's Para biathlon
Silver medal – second place	Vancouver 2010	12.5km visually impaired
Silver medal – second place	Vancouver 2010	3km pursuit visually impaired
Bronze medal – third place	Turin 2006	5km visually impaired
Bronze medal – third place	Vancouver 2010	1km sprint visually impaired

Lioubov Vasilieva (born 24 May 1967) is a Russian female visually impaired Para cross-country skier and biathlete. She has represented Russia at the Paralympics in 2006 and in 2010 claiming 9 medals in her Paralympic career including 3 gold medals in her debut Paralympic event including the cross-country skiing events during the 2006 Winter Paralympics.

== Career ==
Liubov Vasilieva was part of the Russian delegation at the 2006 Winter Paralympics and displayed her medal hunt as she claimed 3 gold medals in the cross-country skiing and a bronze medal in the biathlon events.

She continued her medal success at the Winter Paralympics as she clinched 5 medals during the 2010 Winter Paralympics including a gold, silver medals in the cross-country skiing and 2 silver and a bronze medal in the biathlon events.
