= Vivian Hösch =

German para biathlete and cross-country skier (born 1991)

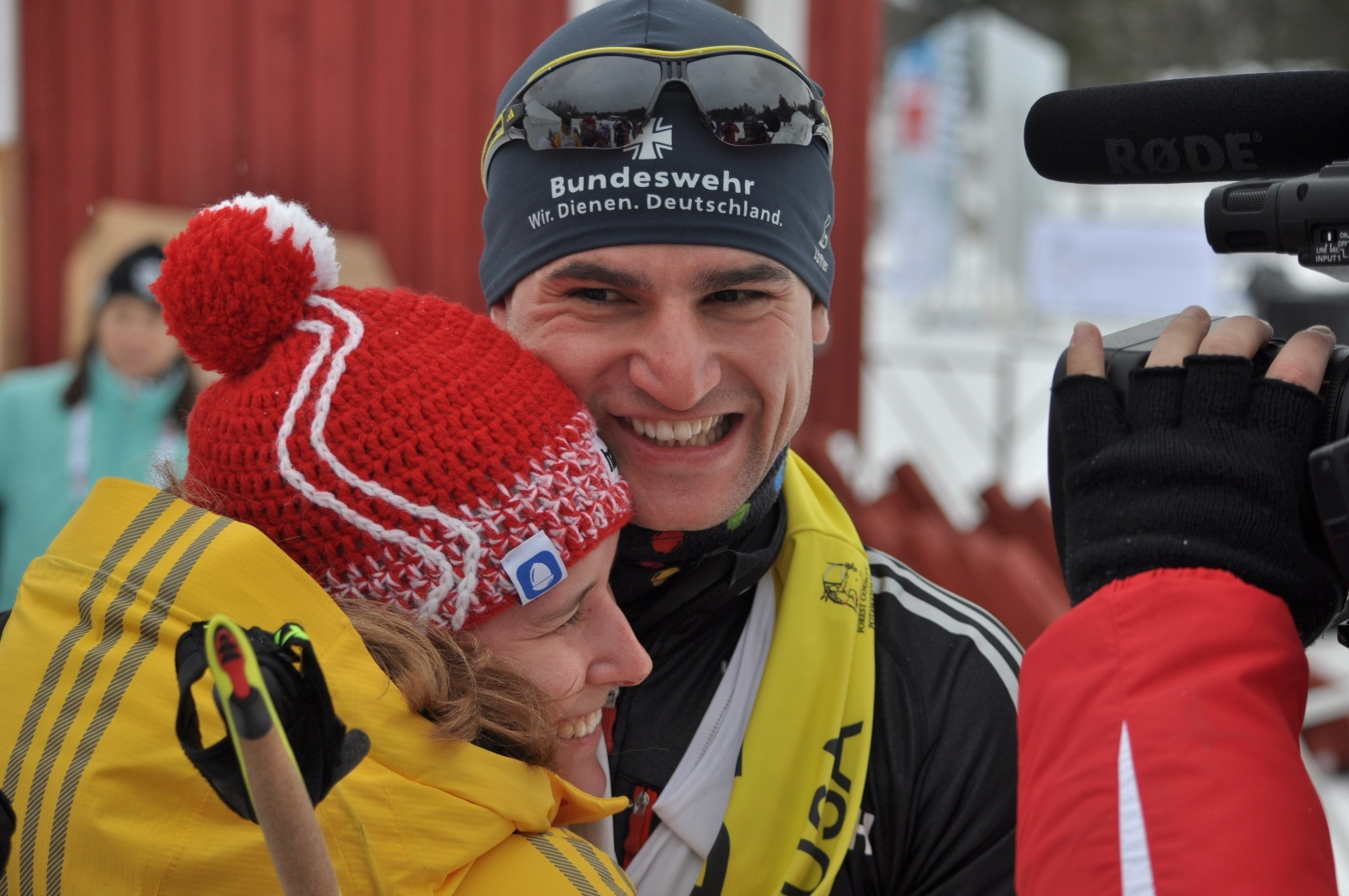
- Vivian Hösch and guide Florian Schillinger after their bronze medals at the 2015 World Championships in Cable (USA)

Personal information
- Born: 18 March 1991 (age 35) Freiburg, Germany

Sport
- Country: Germany
- Sport: Para biathlon; Para cross-country skiing

Achievements and titles
- Paralympic finals: 2014, 2018
Medal record
Women's para biathlon
Representing Germany
World Championships
Bronze medal – third place	2015 Cable	6 km

Vivian Hösch (also spelled Hoesch, born 18 March 1991) is a visually impaired German para biathlete and para cross-country skier.

Hösch competed for Germany at the 2014 Winter Paralympics in Sochi, where she finished fifth in the 5 km cross-country skiing event and sixth in the 6 km biathlon event. At the 2015 IPC Biathlon and Cross-Country Skiing World Championships in Cable, she won a bronze medal in the 6 km biathlon event. She competed again for Germany at the 2018 Winter Paralympics in Pyeongchang, where she finished seventh in the 6 km biathlon event.
