= Marta Zaynullina =

Russian Paralympic cross-country skier and biathlete

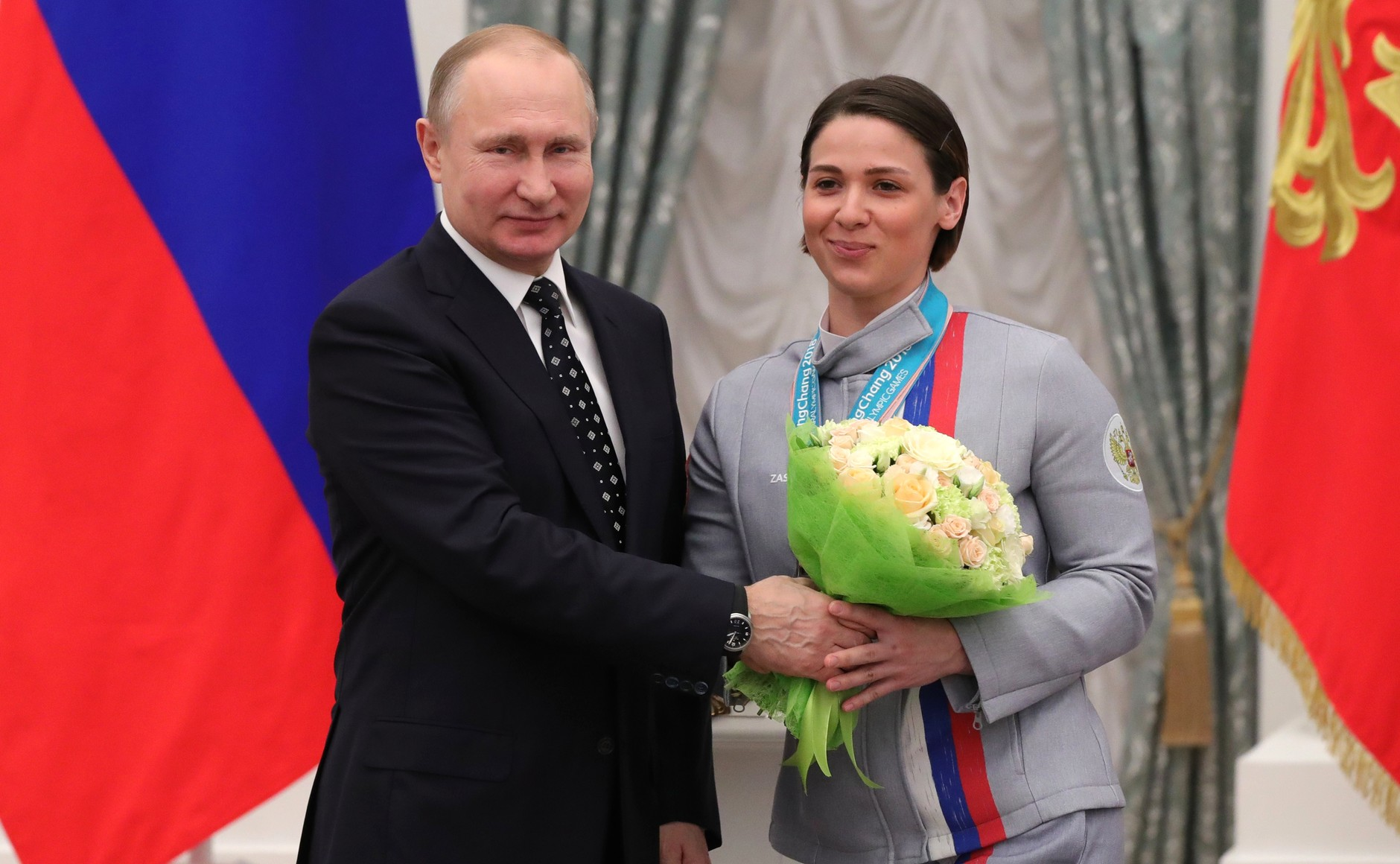
- Zaynullina (right) with Vladimir Putin (left) after the 2018 Winter Paralympics

Personal information
- Nationality: Russian
- Born: July 30, 1990 (age 35) Nizhnekamsk, Soviet Union

Sport
- Country: Russia
- Sport: Paralympic Nordic skiing (Paralympic biathlon and Paralympic cross-country skiing)
- Disability class: LW12
- Coached by: Irina Polyakova
Medal record
Winter Paralympics
Representing Russia
Women's para cross-country skiing
Bronze medal – third place	2014 Sochi	1km sprint sitting
Representing the Neutral Paralympic Athletes
Women's para biathlon
Silver medal – second place	2018 Pyeongchang	10km sitting
Women's para cross-country skiing
Bronze medal – third place	2018 Pyeongchang	1.5km sprint classical sitting

Marta Zaynullina (born 30 July 1990) is a Russian Paralympic cross-country skier and biathlete. She represented Russia at the 2014 Winter Paralympics which was held in her home nation and competed in the cross-country skiing and biathlon events. She claimed a bronze medal in the women's 1km sprint sitting classic event during the 2014 Winter Paralympics. She also competed as a neutral athlete in the 2018 Winter Paralympics.

== Biography ==
Marta Zaynullina was born on the 30th of July, 1990 in Nizhnekamsk as a twin child just a few minutes after her twin brother's birth. At the age of 14, she was found to have a Malignant tumour in her hip which eventually caused amputation to her legs. She was advised by the fellow Russian Paralympic cross-country skier, Irina Polyakova to take the sport of Paralympic cross-country skiing who later went onto become an official coach to Marta Zaynullina.

== Honours ==
Zaynullina has received several awards for her performance in the winter Paralympic games. She was given the Order for Merit to the Fatherland class II in 2014 in recognition of her achievements at the 2014 Paralympics. In 2018, she received two further honours for her performance in the 2018 Winter Paralympics: the Order "For Merit to the Fatherland" class I and award from the Republic of Tatarstan.
