= Colette Bourgonje =

Canadian Paralympic athlete

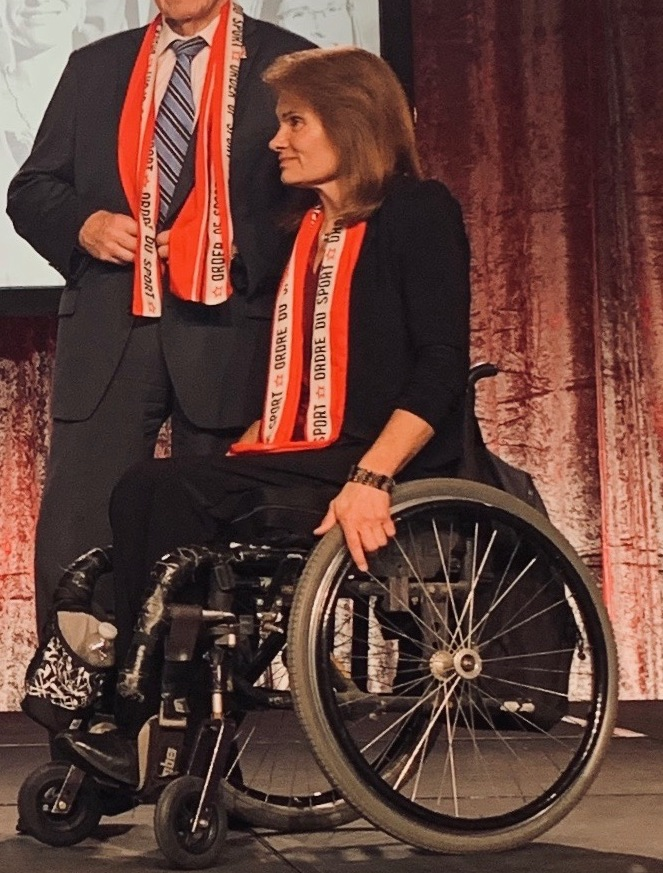
Colette Bourgonje at the 64th Annual Order of Sport Awards in 2019.

Colette Bourgonje (ber-gon-yah; born January 17, 1962) is a Canadian Paralympic cross-country skier and athlete of Métis heritage. She has won four bronze medals in the Summer Paralympics and medals in the Winter Paralympics for skiing. Bourgonje's silver medal in the 10 km sit-ski at the 2010 Winter Paralympics was Canada's first at home.

She is a part-time physical education substitute teacher, and currently resides in Prince Albert. To honour Colette, an elementary school and a street have been named after her in Saskatoon. In 1997, a sign was placed Porcupine Plain, promoting it as Bourgonje's and distinguishing her as a successful Paralympian. She was awarded the Order of Sport, marking her induction into Canada's Sports Hall of Fame in 2019, and a 2021 inductee in the Saskatchewan Sports Hall of Fame.

== Early life ==
Bourgonje is a Dutch surname, but her Indigenous background on her mother's side leads back to a leader named Gabriel Dumont, who set up a Métis government at Batoche in the Northwest Territories.

Her father was an electrician and had a business, but was not able to keep it due to his alcoholism. Bourgonje's mother, Sheila, and grandmother comforted the children through difficult times. Bourgonje's father later left the family in 1984 while Colette was studying for her undergraduate degree.

Bourgonje participated in many sports as a child and young teenager, and was successful in hockey, football and various track and field events.

== Accident ==
Bourgonje was left paralyzed after a car accident in 1980, two months away from graduating high school. She had been a cross country runner, with many athletic scholarship offers to many universities.

Her brother needed to be dropped off in Hudson Bay, so Colette and her boyfriend at the time took him in her brother's new car. On the way back, she let her boyfriend drive, and he lost control on the slippery road, and Colette was ejected from the car. To get Colette to the hospital in Saskatoon in time, 40-50 vehicles in Porcupine Plain shone their headlights on the plane strip landing so the air ambulance could land. The accident punctured her lungs, broke her sternum and back. 98% of her spine was severed and two Harrington rods were placed in her back to maintain the curvature of her back.

Bourgonje admitted her immobilization to her uncle Don, who was instructed by Colette to tell everyone else.

Barbara Dorsey, a professor at the College of Physical Education at the University of Saskatchewan visited Bourgonje in the hospital and encouraged her to continue considering attending, regardless of the accident. She agreed that as long as Colette was able to finish twelfth grade, the university would accept her.

She was introduced to Para Sport by the Saskatchewan Wheelchair Sports Association (SWSA) shortly after the accident because she had previously been a cross country runner.

She spent the summer of 1980 rehabilitating and wrote an advert in the local paper, thanking her community for their continuous support.

== Sports career ==
Bourgonje was initially introduced to Para Sport by Saskatchewan Wheelchair Sports Association (SWSA) shortly after her accident, and joined the association in 1987. She had to train herself at first, as very few coaches knew how to train athletes with disabilities. She used her knowledge from school and her training prior to her accident to train, and was cautious to not overwork herself.

Medals	Race	Games
Gold	800m wheelchair race	1990 Commonwealth Games
Bronze	100m and 800m wheelchair race	1992 Summer Paralympics
Bronze	100m and 200m wheelchair race	1996 Summer Paralympics
Silver	2.5 km and 5 km Para-Nordic sit ski	1998 Winter Paralympics
Bronze	5 km freestyle and 10 km classic Para-Nordic ski	2006 Winter Paralympics
Silver	5 km and 10 km Par-Nordic sit ski	2010 Winter Paralympics
Gold	10 km sit ski	2011 IPC Biathlon and Cross-Country Skiing World Championships

Bourgonje is one of few Canadians to receive medals in both the Summer and Winter Paralympic Games. She has competed in six winter Paralympic Games in sit skiing and three summer Paralympic Games as a wheelchair racer.

She gave one of her silver medals from the 1998 Games to Pat Prokopchuk, as she brought and initiated the remodelling of the sit ski in Saskatchewan.

When her age was questioned after participating in the Olympics in Vancouver in 2010, and receiving the first medal on Canadian turf, she responded with "age is nothing, attitude is everything and I live by that today".

Bourgonje was also a part of the Team Visa Inc. Program in 2010, which supports 30 individual athletes globally to prepare for the Olympics and Paralympics. They do this by providing valuable marketing, long term financial support and mentorship.

== Sit Skiing ==
SASKI-Skiing for Disabled began in the early 1990s, with skiing for the blind and were looking for other disabled persons to become physically active.

Her friend and president of SASKI, Pat Prokopchuk and others created Colette's first sit ski in 1993. It was remodelled from one from Denmark, which was weak and broke after short use. The Saskatchewan Abilities Council was able to mould the sit ski to Colette's body, while making the model out of fibreglass and clamping the skis to the chair. After the 1994 World Cup Championships, the German team shared their sit ski prototype which Colette liked, with the bucket attached to the skis. In 2002, the Memorial University of Newfoundland made Colette a special sit ski which was much lighter but more difficult to balance. She later traded hand control model equipment for cars with the Russian team for their sit ski, which was made of titanium.

== Teaching career ==
She was the first to graduate from the University of Saskatchewan's Physical Education program in a wheelchair, as well as the first woman to graduate from this program in Canada. The program made accommodations for her, including a $200,000 ramp. She stayed with two professors, Dorsey and Lawson during her degree.

Her first job out of her university education was as an after school recreational coordinator in Saskatoon. She began teaching physical education part-time to continue training from 1989 to 2010, with her first position in Silverwood Heights, Saskatoon. With her physical disability, she finds ways to overcome teaching obstacles, by using student demonstrators and having the children safely set up simple equipment. Her main focus is in physical activity, and would devote an allotted time daily for activities, even teaching them to cross country ski.

== Community Involvement ==
Bourgonje is an advocate for physical activity and sport participation, and does this by hosting various events, coaching cross country skiers with disabilities and working with the In Motion program in Saskatchewan, which works to help people increase their physical activity levels.

The "Inaugural Saskatchewan Para Sport Tour Dream Relay" was thought of when Bourgonje saw a need for raising awareness for Para Sport activities for Saskatchewan citizens. The relay was held in June 2016, touring Saskatchewan and it included 14 Parathletes in a 10 day, 363 kilometre course. Another reason for the establishment for the relay was to find those with disabilities looking to be physically active, and to connect them with volunteer equipment if that was a barrier for them.

Bourgonje spoke at the 11th annual "Training for Life Power Breakfast" in 2016, which is an event that raises money for the Special Olympics of Saskatchewan and Prince Albert Raiders Education Fund.

Along with her friend and president, Pat Prokopchuk, Colette is part of SASKI-Skiing for Disabled, which gives funds to those who are struggling in the sit ski community. The organization helps with costs of equipment, travelling, memberships and the loaning of sit skis to facilities which have sit skiing members.

She often speaks encouraging messages at hospitals and rehabilitation centres for people recently immobilized. Her talks inspires others to face their new reality and to move forward.

== Mentoring ==
Bourgonje places great emphasis on coaching and often looks for future Paralympians. She mentors many successful athletes and understands the dynamics between those she coaches and herself. One of the mentees she oversees is Brittany Hudak, who is missing part of her left arm and the two met in a Canadian Tire. Bourgonje trained her to ski and she went on to win three gold medals at the 2015 Jeux du Canada Hames in Prince George, British Columbia. Her gold medal events were the 1.2 kilometre standing classic sprint, 2.5 kilometre classic sprint and the 5 kilometre standing free event.

== Awards and honours ==
In 1996, received the Breakthrough Award presented by the Canadian Association for the Advancement of Women and Sport and Physical Activity (CAAWS).

In 1998, inducted into the Saskatoon Sports Hall of Fame.

In 1999, received one of the YWCA Women of Distinction awards

In 2002, the Canadian Paraplegic Association (CPA) awarded her the Female Athlete of Year award.

At the 2010 Winter Olympics, she was presented with the Whang Youn Dai Achievement Award, which is awarded to one male and female athlete with a disability, for overcoming adversities.

In 2010, Bourgonje was inducted into the Canadian Disability Hall of Fame.

The 2011 SaskSport Athlete of the Year.

In 2019, she was awarded the Order of Sport, marking her induction into Canada's Sports Hall of Fame.

In 2021, Bourgonje became an inductee in Saskatchewan Sports Hall of Fame.
