= Elena Remizova =

Russian Paralympic skier

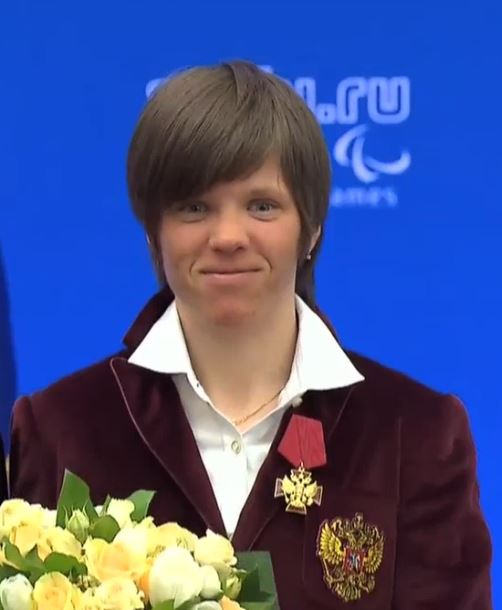

Personal information
- Born: 22 September 1986 (age 39)

Sport
- Country: Russia
- Sport: Skiing
Medal record
Paralympic Games
Women's Cross-country skiing
Gold medal – first place	2014 Sochi	15km classic skiing
Gold medal – first place	2014 Sochi	5km free
Gold medal – first place	2014 Sochi	4 × 2.5 km relay open
Silver medal – second place	2014 Sochi	1km sprint classic

Elena Remizova (born 22 September 1986) is a Russian visually impaired Paralympic skier who won three gold and one silver medal at the 2014 Winter Paralympics. She won her first gold medal in women's 15 km classic skiing in Sochi, Russia in 2014.
