= Maija Järvelä =

Finnish biathlete (born 1984)

Personal information
- Native name: Maija Loytynoja
- Nationality: Finnish
- Born: January 17, 1984 (age 42) Raahe, Finland

Sport
- Disability class: LW6/8
Medal record
Representing Finland
Women's Biathlon
Winter Paralympics
Silver medal – second place	Vancouver 2010	pursuit standing

Maija Järvelä also commonly known as Maija Loytynoja (born 17 January 1984) is a Finnish female biathlete and cross-country skier. She represented Finland at the Paralympics in 2006, 2010 and 2014. Järvelä won a silver medal in the women's pursuit standing biathlon event at the 2010 Winter Paralympics, the first medal won by Finland at the 2010 games.
