= Maria Iovleva =

Paralympic biathlete of Russia

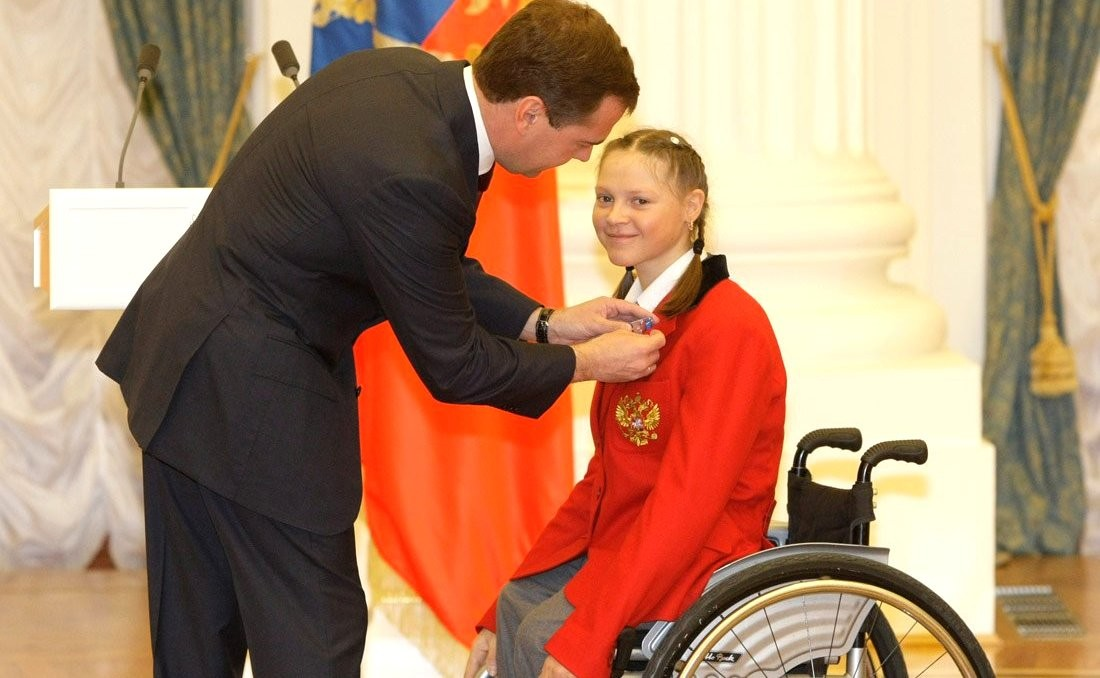
- Maria Iovleva (right) in 2010

Personal information
- National team: Russia

Sport
- Sport: Paralympic biathlon, Cross-country skiing
- Coached by: Tatiana Lindt; Irina Gromova

Achievements and titles
- Paralympic finals: 2010 Winter Paralympics: Sitting Biathlon – Gold; Sitting Biathlon – Silver; Cross-country Relay – Gold

Maria Iovleva (born 18 February 1990) is a Russian biathlete and cross-country skier representing Russia at the 2010 Winter Paralympics.

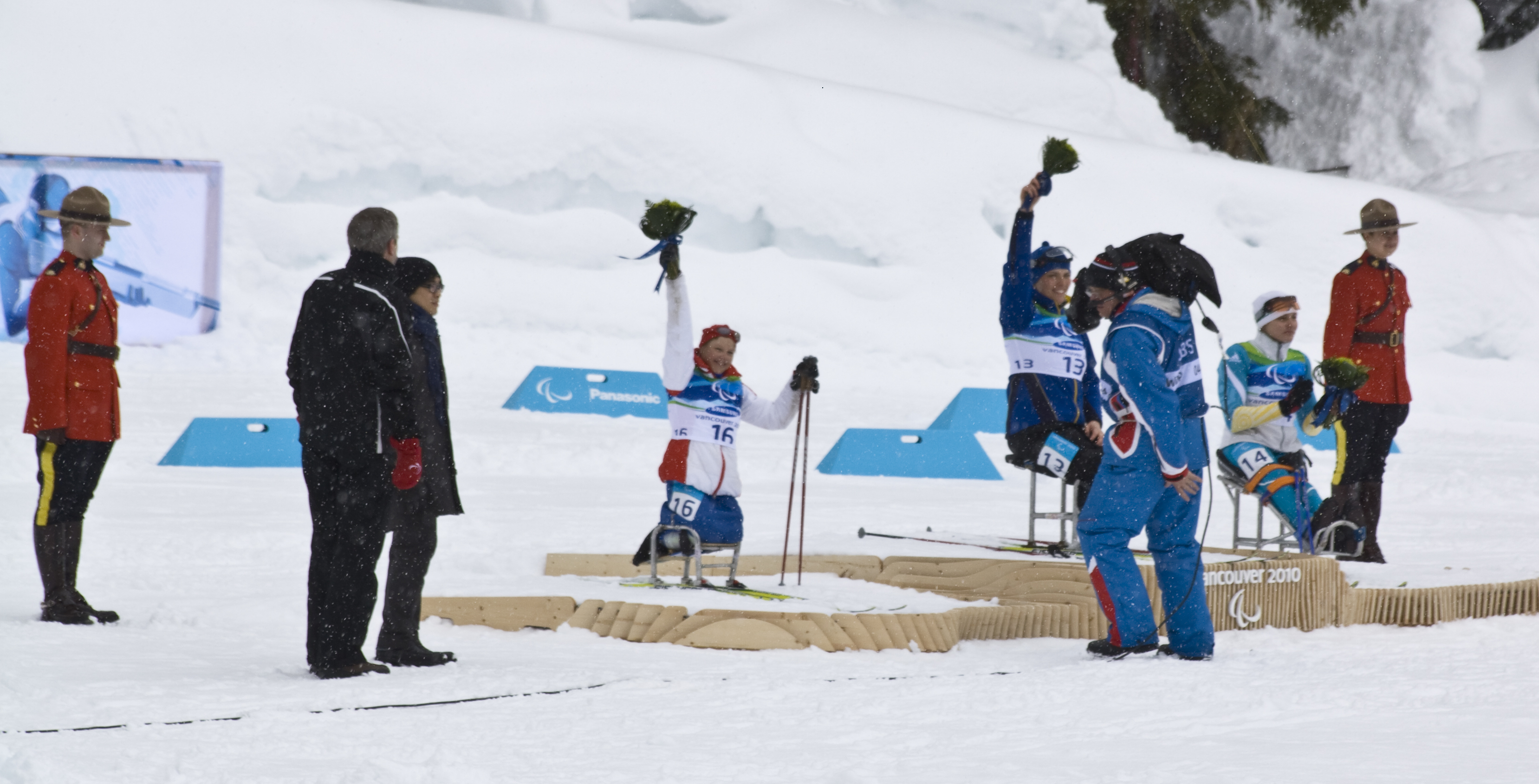
Women's 2.4km Pursuit Sitting Biathlon flower ceremony at the 2010 Paralympics. Olena Iurkovska of Ukraine (gold), Maria Iovleva of Russia (silver), Lyudmyla Pavlenko of Ukraine (bronze).

She won two medals in sitting biathlon, one of them gold and was on the gold medal team of women's cross-country relay. She is deaf and paralyzed. She lived in Kochpon Psychoneurological Institute and was friends with parathlete Ivan Golubkov, who she inspired with her wins. She left the institution at 28. She lives in a home with twelve other disabled women, but she dreams of getting an apartment of her own due to her medal wins.
