= Lyudmyla Pavlenko =

Ukrainian Paralympic cross-country skier and biathlete

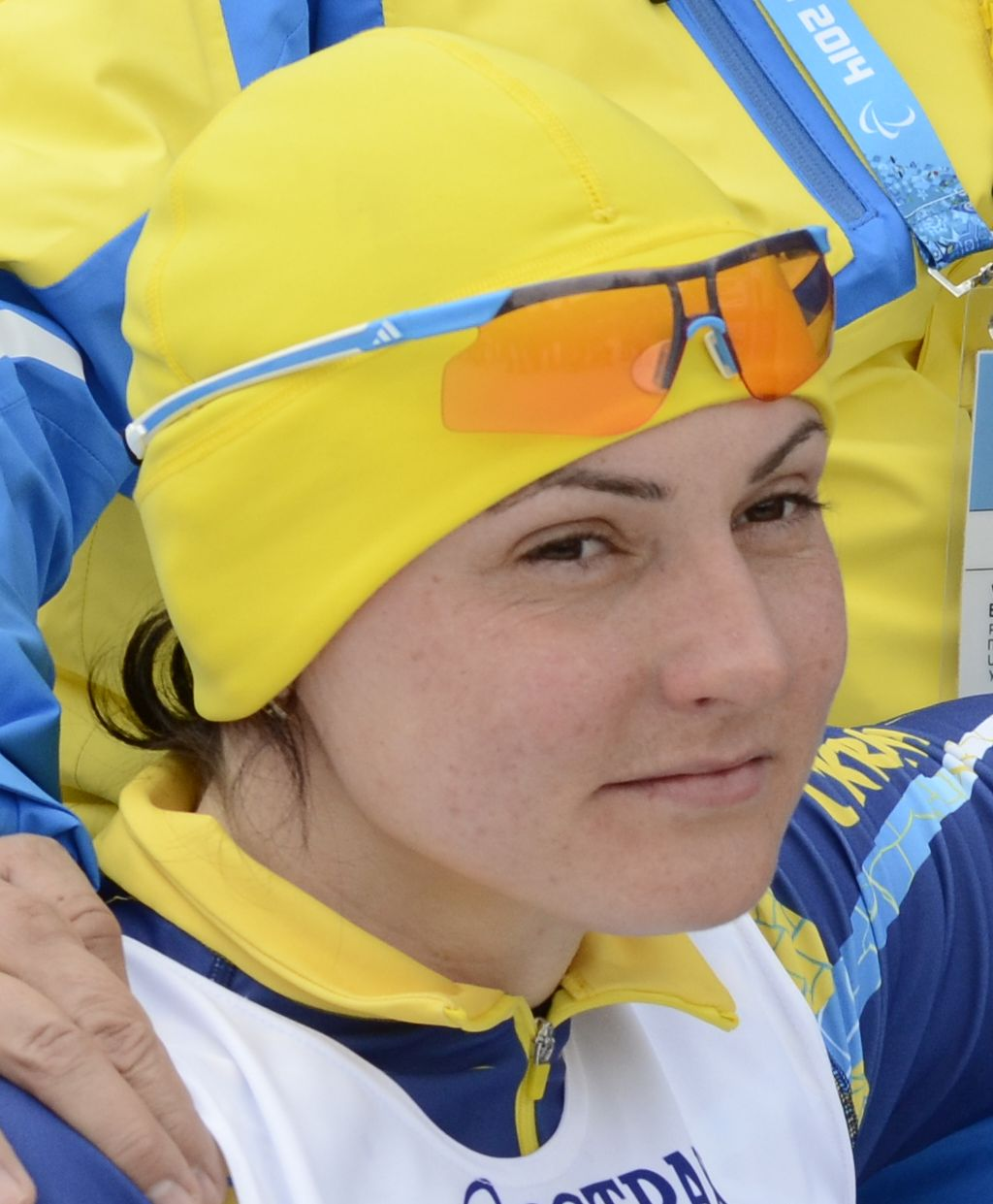
- Pavlenko in 2014

Personal information
- Full name: Lyudmyla Volodymyrivna Pavlenko
- Born: 16 September 1981 (age 44)
Medal record
Paralympic Games
Representing Ukraine
Women's para cross-country skiing
| Gold medal – first place | 2014 Sochi | 12 km, sitting |
| Bronze medal – third place | 2006 Turin | 2.5 km, sitski |
| Bronze medal – third place | 2006 Turin | 3x2.5 km relay, open |
Women's para biathlon
| Silver medal – second place | 2006 Torino | 10 km, sitting |
| Bronze medal – third place | 2006 Torino | 7.5 km, sitting |
| Bronze medal – third place | 2010 Vancouver | 2.4 km, sitting |
| Bronze medal – third place | 2014 Sochi | 10 km, sitting |
World Championships
Women's para cross-country skiing
| Gold medal – first place | 2005 Fort Kent | 10 km, sitski |
| Gold medal – first place | 2005 Fort Kent | 2.5 km, sitski |
| Silver medal – second place | 2005 Fort Kent | 3x2.5 km relay, open |
| Bronze medal – third place | 2009 Vuokatti | 10 km, sitting |
| Bronze medal – third place | 2009 Vuokatti | 2.5 km, sitting |
| Bronze medal – third place | 2013 Sollefteå | 10 km, sitski |
Women's para biathlon
| Silver medal – second place | 2009 Vuokatti | 3 km pursuit, sitting |
| Silver medal – second place | 2011 Khanty-Mansiysk | 7.5 km, sitting |
| Bronze medal – third place | 2009 Vuokatti | 10 km, sitting |
| Bronze medal – third place | 2011 Khanty-Mansiysk | 10 km, sitting |

Lyudmyla Volodymyrivna Pavlenko (Ukrainian: Людмила Володимирівна Павленко, born 16 September 1981) is a Ukrainian Paralympic cross-country skier and biathlete, with cerebral palsy. She won a gold and bronze medal, at the 2014 Winter Paralympics.

She has a son, Mikhail, with her husband, Dmitri.

== See also ==
- Cross-country skiing at the 2014 Winter Paralympics – Women's 15 km Free
- Biathlon at the 2014 Winter Paralympics – Women's 10 kilometres
