= Katarzyna Rogowiec =

Polish Paralympian (born 1977)

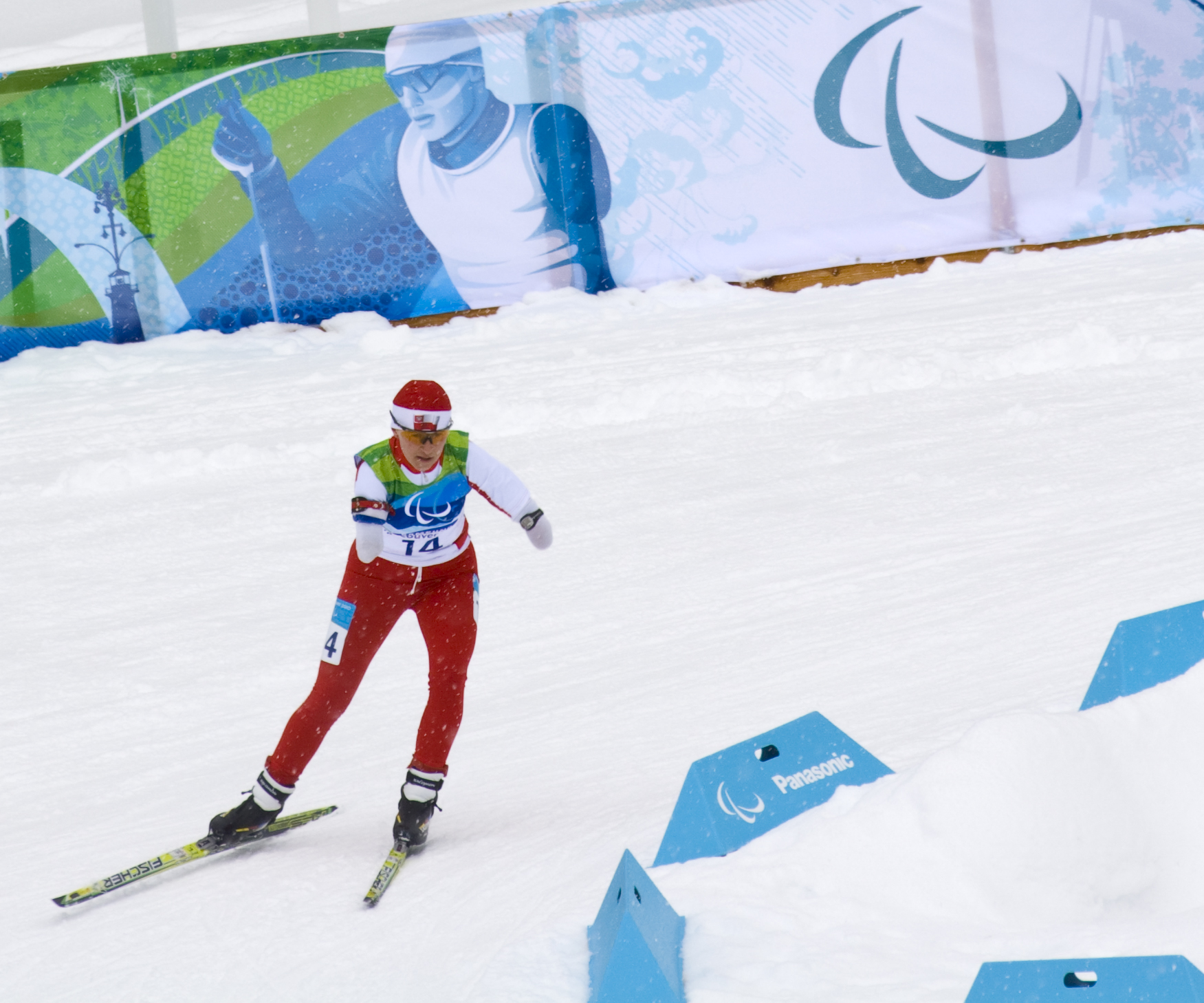
- Katarzyna Rogowiec, receiving her Cavalier's Cross of the Order of Poland Reborn from the President of the Republic of Poland in 2006

Personal information
- Nationality: Polish
- Born: October 14, 1977 (age 48) Rabka-Zdrój, Poland
- Website: katarzyna-rogowiec.pl

Sport
- Sport: Cross-country skiing
- Event: All
- Club: "START" Nowy Sacz Club
Medal record
Women's cross-country skiing
Representing Poland
Paralympic Games
Gold medal – first place	2006 Torino	5 km - Standing
Gold medal – first place	2006 Torino	15 km - Standing
Silver medal – second place	2010 Vancouver	15 km - Free Style
- Updated on 10 January 2014

Katarzyna Rogowiec (born 14 October 1977) is a Polish Paralympian. She won two gold medals at the 2006 Winter Paralympics in Turin in cross-country skiing, and also competes at the highest levels in biathlon (current world champion).

Rogowiec hails from the Polish mountain folk (Polish: górale). She was born in Rabka-Zdrój, Poland. She is an economist by training, and lives in Kraków, while training in Nowy Sącz.

She won three silver medals at the 2003 World Championships, and was the world champion in biathlon in the 12.5 km Individual at the 2005 World Championships.

When she was three years old, she suffered a debilitating accident at harvest, when a harvesting machine cut off both of her hands. She says that she does not remember any of that, except for hearing it through her parents' tales. She grew up and learned to eat and drink without the use of hands.

In 2010, she established the Katarzyna Rogowiec Foundation avanti.

Katarzyna will not be appearing at the 2014 Winter Paralympics in Sochi.

== Education ==
- College of People Management in Warsaw, People Management: post-graduate studies
- Cracow University of Economics, Finance and Banking: Public Finance
- II High School in Rabka - Zdroj

== Sport achievements ==
=== Paralympic Olympics ===
2002 Winter Paralympic Games in Salt-Lake City

- 4th place in cross-country skiing on 5 km: classic technique

2006 Winter Paralympic Games in Turin

- 1st place in cross-country skiing (5 km): free style
- 1st place in cross-country skiing (15 km): classic technique
- 4th place in cross-country skiing (10 km): classic technique
- 4th and 6th place in biathlon (7.5 km and 12.5 km)
- 6th place in women's relay

2010 Winter Paralympic Games in Vancouver

- 3rd place in cross-country skiing (15 km): free style
- 4th place in biathlon (12.5 km)
- 5th place in biathlon pursuit
- 6th place in women's relay

=== World Championships ===
2003 World Championships in Baiersbronn, Germany

- 3rd place in cross-country skiing (10 km): classic technique
- 3rd place in cross-country skiing (15 km) free style
- 3rd place in women's relay

2005 World Championships in Fort Kent, United States

- 1st place in biathlon (12.5 km)
- 2nd place in biathlon (7.5 km)
- 3rd place in cross-country skiing (5 km): classic technique
- 3rd place in cross-country skiing (10 km): free style

2009 World Championships in Vuocatti, Finland

- 4th place in cross - country skiing (5 km): free style
- 7th place in sprint: classic technique

2011 World Championships in Khanty Mansiysk, Russia

- 1st place in cross-country skiing (5 km): free style
- 2nd place in sprint
- 2nd place in biathlon sprint
- 2nd place in biathlon (7.5 km)
- 2nd place in biathlon (12.5 km)
- 3rd place in cross-country skiing (15 km): classic style

=== World Cup ===
- 2005/2006 - cross-country skiing: 3rd place
- 2006/2007 - cross-country skiing: 2nd place
- 2007/2008 - cross-country skiing: 7th place, biathlon: 6th place
- 2008/2009 - cross-country skiing: 7th place, biathlon: 3rd place
- 2009/2010 - cross-country skiing: 4th place, biathlon: 7th place
- 2010/2011 - cross-country skiing: 4th place, biathlon: 4th place
- 2011/2012 - cross-country skiing: 1st place (Crystal Ball), biathlon: 2nd place

== Other sports experiences ==
- Member of The IPC Athletes Council (since 2006)
- Member of The World Anti-Doping Agency Athletes Council (since 2009)
- Independent Observer - Commonwealth Games Delhi 2010 Mission
- 2000-2007 - participation in several athletics competitions
- 2008 - gained the summit of Kilimanjaro
- participation in several marathons

== Awards and honors ==
- The Order of Polonia Restituta
- Gold badge "FOR MERIT FOR SPORT"
- The Jubilee Medal "80 Years of Cracow University
- Winner of 73. Poll Sport Champions in Disabled Athlete category
- Several Awards from Marshal of the Malopolska voivodship
- Best Disabled Athlete in 2006, 2010, 2011
