= Cross-country skiing at the 2006 Winter Paralympics – Women's long distance =

Cross-country skiing - Women's long at the IX Paralympic Winter Games
- Paralympic cross-country skiing
- Venue: Pragelato
- Dates: 18–19 March 2006

Women's long distance cross-country classic skiing events at the 2006 Winter Paralympics were contested at Pragelato on 18–19 March.

There were 3 events, of 15 km or 10 km distance. Standings were decided by applying a disability factor to the actual times achieved.

== Results ==
=== 15km Visually impaired ===
The visually impaired event took place on 19 March. It was won by Lioubov Vasilieva, representing Russia.

Rank	Name	Country	Real Time	Factor	Finish Time
1st place, gold medalist(s)	Lioubov Vasilieva	Russia	53:57.6	98	52:52.9
2nd place, silver medalist(s)	Yadviha Skarabahataya	Belarus	54:26.4	98	53:21.1
3rd place, bronze medalist(s)	Tatiana Ilioutchenko	Russia	53:31.0	100	53:31.0
4	Sisko Kiiski	Finland	54:05.3	100	54:05.3
5	Verena Bentele	Germany	1:02:36.8	87	54:28.4
6	Miyuki Kobayashi	Japan	1:03:21.4	87	55:07.2
7	Han Lixia	China	56:42.4	98	55:34.4
8	Elvira Ibraginova	Russia	55:47.5	100	55:47.5
9	Viktoriya Chernova	Russia	57:12.5	98	56:03.9
10	Tone Gravvold	Norway	58:48.5	98	57:37.9
11	Tetyana Smyrnova	Ukraine	59:38.1	100	59:38.1
12	Emilie Tabouret	France	1:08:55.2	87	59:57.6
13	Nathalie Morin	France	1:01:14.3	100	1:01:14.3
14	Blagovesta Koleva	Bulgaria	1:10:19.5	100	1:10:19.5

=== 10km Sitting ===
The sitting event took place on 18 March. It was won by Liudmila Vauchok, representing Belarus.

Rank	Name	Country	Real Time	Factor	Finish Time
1st place, gold medalist(s)	Liudmila Vauchok	Belarus	32:52.8	94	30:54.5
2nd place, silver medalist(s)	Olena Iurkovska	Ukraine	31:50.9	100	31:50.9
3rd place, bronze medalist(s)	Colette Bourgonje	Canada	37:34.4	86	32:18.8
4	Lyudmyla Pavlenko	Ukraine	33:22.2	98	32:42.2
5	Monica Bascio	United States	35:07.0	94	33:00.6
6	Svitlana Tryfonova	Ukraine	35:33.3	94	33:25.3
7	Shauna Maria Whyte	Canada	34:51.3	98	34:09.5
8	Candace Cable	United States	37:27.7	94	35:12.8
9	Zhang Nannan	China	39:51.2	100	39:51.2
	Francesca Porcellato	Italy	DNF		
	Irina Polyakova	Russia	DNS		

=== 15km Standing ===
The standing event took place on 19 March. It was won by Katarzyna Rogowiec, representing Poland.

Rank	Name	Country	Real Time	Factor	Finish Time
1st place, gold medalist(s)	Katarzyna Rogowiec	Poland	1:06:41.3	79	52:41.0
2nd place, silver medalist(s)	Anna Burmistrova	Russia	59:13.3	92	54:29.1
3rd place, bronze medalist(s)	Yuliya Batenkova	Ukraine	1:00:48.3	91	55:20.0
4	Chiara Devittori	Switzerland	59:50.5	96	57:26.9
5	Iryna Kyrychenko	Ukraine	1:06:34.0	87	57:54.8
6	Larysa Varona	Belarus	1:03:12.7	92	58:09.3
7	Anne Floriet	France	1:05:34.6	90	59:01.1
8	Maija Loeytynoja	Finland	1:05:14.4	92	1:00:01.2
9	Grazyna Gron	Poland	1:06:27.0	92	1:01:08.0
10	Kelly Underkofler	United States	1:07:06.6	92	1:01:44.5
11	Stina Sellin	Sweden	1:07:37.0	92	1:02:12.4
12	Peng Yuanyuan	China	1:11:51.7	92	1:06:06.7
13	Momoko Dekijima	Japan	1:12:50.5	91	1:06:17.1
	Alena Gorbunova	Russia	DNF		
	Anna Szarota	Poland	DNS		
