= Cross-country skiing at the 2006 Winter Paralympics – Women's short distance =

Cross-country skiing - Women's short at the IX Paralympic Winter Games
- Paralympic cross-country skiing
- Venue: Pragelato
- Dates: 12 March 2006

Women's short distance cross-country free skiing events at the 2006 Winter Paralympics were contested at Pragelato on 12 March.

There were 3 events, of 5 km or 2.5 km distance. Standings were decided by applying a disability factor to the actual times achieved.

== Results ==
=== 5km Visually impaired ===
The visually impaired event was won by Verena Bentele, representing Germany.

Rank	Name	Country	Real Time	Factor	Finish Time
1st place, gold medalist(s)	Verena Bentele	Germany	16:54.3	85	14:22.1
2nd place, silver medalist(s)	Tatiana Ilioutchenko	Russia	14:55.9	100	14:55.9
3rd place, bronze medalist(s)	Lioubov Vasilieva	Russia	15:32.1	98	15:13.5
4	Elvira Ibraginova	Russia	15:54.1	100	15:54.1
5	Emilie Tabouret	France	18:46.5	85	15:57.5
6	Yadviha Skarabahataya	Belarus	16:38.1	98	16:18.1
7	Anne-Mette Bredahl	Denmark	19:19.7	85	16:25.7
8	Sisko Kiiski	Finland	16:29.2	100	16:29.2
9	Tone Gravvold	Norway	17:05.5	98	16:45.0
10	Han Lixia	China	17:08.2	98	16:47.6
11	Nathalie Morin	France	16:55.9	100	16:55.9
12	Tetyana Smyrnova	Ukraine	17:19.9	100	17:19.9
13	Blagovesta Koleva	Bulgaria	22:20.3	100	22:20.3

=== 2.5km Sitting ===
The sitting event was won by Olena Iurkovska, representing Ukraine.

Rank	Name	Country	Real Time	Factor	Finish Time
1st place, gold medalist(s)	Olena Iurkovska	Ukraine	8:27.9	100	8:27.9
2nd place, silver medalist(s)	Liudmila Vauchok	Belarus	9:20.1	94	8:46.5
3rd place, bronze medalist(s)	Lyudmyla Pavlenko	Ukraine	9:04.9	98	8:54.0
4	Irina Polyakova	Russia	9:00.0	100	9:00.0
5	Svitlana Tryfonova	Ukraine	9:59.2	94	9:23.2
6	Colette Bourgonje	Canada	11:03.4	86	9:30.5
7	Shauna Maria Whyte	Canada	10:00.6	98	9:48.6
8	Candace Cable	United States	10:26.3	94	9:48.7
9	Monica Bascio	United States	10:42.7	94	10:04.1
10	Francesca Porcellato	Italy	12:29.9	86	10:44.9
11	Zhang Nannan	China	11:10.2	100	11:10.2

=== 5km Standing ===
The standing event was won by Katarzyna Rogowiec, representing Poland.

Rank	Name	Country	Real Time	Factor	Finish Time
1st place, gold medalist(s)	Katarzyna Rogowiec	Poland	17:15.3	87	15:00.7
2nd place, silver medalist(s)	Anna Burmistrova	Russia	15:56.7	97	15:28.0
3rd place, bronze medalist(s)	Yuliya Batenkova	Ukraine	16:25.0	96	15:45.6
4	Anne Floriet	France	17:42.7	91	16:07.0
5	Chiara Devittori	Switzerland	17:09.7	96	16:28.5
6	Alena Gorbunova	Russia	17:24.3	97	16:53.0
7	Maija Loeytynoja	Finland	17:24.9	97	16:53.6
8	Kelly Underkofler	United States	17:34.2	97	17:02.6
9	Larysa Varona	Belarus	17:45.9	97	17:14.0
10	Pamela Novaglio	Italy	18:14.3	96	17:30.5
11	Stina Sellin	Sweden	18:37.0	97	18:03.5
12	Anna Szarota	Poland	19:07.4	96	18:21.5
13	Grazyna Gron	Poland	19:11.9	97	18:37.3
14	Momoko Dekijima	Japan	19:40.0	96	18:52.8
15	Peng Yuanyuan	China	21:18.1	97	20:39.8
