= Cross-country skiing at the 2006 Winter Paralympics – Women's middle distance =

Cross-country skiing - Women's middle at the IX Paralympic Winter Games
- Paralympic cross-country skiing
- Venue: Pragelato
- Dates: 15 March 2006

Women's middle distance cross-country classic skiing events at the 2006 Winter Paralympics were contested at Pragelato on 15 March.

There were 3 events, of 10 km or 5 km distance. Standings were decided by applying a disability factor to the actual times achieved.

== Results ==
=== 10km Visually impaired ===
The visually impaired event was won by Lioubov Vasilieva, representing Russia.

Rank	Name	Country	Real Time	Factor	Finish Time
1st place, gold medalist(s)	Lioubov Vasilieva	Russia	33:20.7	98	32:40.6
2nd place, silver medalist(s)	Tatiana Ilioutchenko	Russia	33:00.8	100	33:00.8
3rd place, bronze medalist(s)	Yadviha Skarabahataya	Belarus	34:21.1	98	33:39.9
4	Verena Bentele	Germany	38:53.3	87	33:50.0
5	Viktoriya Chernova	Russia	34:32.9	98	33:51.5
6	Miyuki Kobayashi	Japan	39:54.6	87	34:43.3
7	Sisko Kiiski	Finland	34:51.7	100	34:51.7
8	Han Lixia	China	37:13.6	98	36:29.0
9	Emilie Tabouret	France	42:23.0	87	36:52.4
10	Tetyana Smyrnova	Ukraine	37:13.4	100	37:13.4
11	Tone Gravvold	Norway	38:05.5	98	37:19.8

=== 5km Sitting ===
The sitting event was won by Olena Iurkovska, representing Ukraine.

Rank	Name	Country	Real Time	Factor	Finish Time
1st place, gold medalist(s)	Olena Iurkovska	Ukraine	16:39.7	100	16:39.7
2nd place, silver medalist(s)	Liudmila Vauchok	Belarus	18:18.7	94	17:12.8
3rd place, bronze medalist(s)	Colette Bourgonje	Canada	20:07.8	86	17:18.7
4	Lyudmyla Pavlenko	Ukraine	17:49.5	98	17:28.1
5	Svitlana Tryfonova	Ukraine	18:48.1	94	17:40.4
6	Irina Polyakova	Russia	18:01.4	100	18:01.4
7	Monica Bascio	United States	19:40.6	94	18:29.8
8	Shauna Maria Whyte	Canada	18:53.9	98	18:31.2
9	Francesca Porcellato	Italy	21:35.9	86	18:34.4
10	Candace Cable	United States	20:28.8	94	19:15.1
11	Zhang Nannan	China	21:24.8	100	21:24.8

=== 10km Standing ===
The standing event was won by Anna Burmistrova, representing Russia.

Rank	Name	Country	Real Time	Factor	Finish Time
1st place, gold medalist(s)	Anna Burmistrova	Russia	37:10.6	92	34:12.2
2nd place, silver medalist(s)	Yuliya Batenkova	Ukraine	37:55.7	91	34:30.8
3rd place, bronze medalist(s)	Anne Floriet	France	38:30.4	90	34:39.3
4	Katarzyna Rogowiec	Poland	44:12.5	79	34:55.5
5	Chiara Devittori	Switzerland	36:46.4	96	35:18.1
6	Alena Gorbunova	Russia	38:53.0	92	35:46.4
7	Iryna Kyrychenko	Ukraine	43:04.9	87	37:28.8
8	Maija Loeytynoja	Finland	41:19.9	92	38:01.5
9	Shoko Ota	Japan	41:59.8	92	38:38.3
10	Stina Sellin	Sweden	42:04.3	92	38:42.3
11	Kelly Underkofler	United States	43:55.6	92	40:24.8
12	Peng Yuanyuan	China	45:13.2	92	41:36.1
