= Cross-country skiing at the 2006 Winter Paralympics – Men's middle distance =

Cross-country skiing - Men's middle at the IX Paralympic Winter Games
- Paralympic cross-country skiing
- Venue: Pragelato
- Dates: 15 March 2006

Men's middle-distance cross-country classic skiing events at the 2006 Winter Paralympics were contested at Pragelato on 15 March.

There were 3 events, all of 10 km distance. Standings were decided by applying a disability factor to the actual times achieved.

== Results ==
=== Visually impaired ===
The visually impaired event was won by Brian McKeever, representing Canada.

Rank	Name	Country	Real Time	Factor	Finish Time
1st place, gold medalist(s)	Brian McKeever	Canada	26:09.5	100	26:09.5
2nd place, silver medalist(s)	Vasili Shaptsiaboi	Belarus	27:28.4	98	26:55.5
3rd place, bronze medalist(s)	Verlay Koupchinsky	Russia	31:13.8	87	27:10.2
4	Frank Höfle	Germany	28:02.2	98	27:28.6
5	Oleh Munts	Ukraine	31:39.5	87	27:32.5
6	Helge Flo	Norway	32:39.7	87	28:24.9
7	Marian Balaz	Slovakia	29:42.8	98	29:07.2
8	Jarmo Ollanketo	Finland	29:59.3	98	29:23.3
9	Michael Bentele	Germany	34:03.5	87	29:37.9
10	Elie Zampin	France	29:48.2	100	29:48.2
11	Philippe Terral	France	31:02.5	98	30:25.2
12	Ragnar Sorhaug	Norway	32:51.7	98	32:12.2
13	Franz Gatscher	Italy	34:12.1	98	33:31.0
14	Zeinolla Seitov	Kazakhstan	38:20.2	100	38:20.2
15	Aleksandar Tsokanov	Bulgaria	40:43.6	98	39:54.7
	Vitaliy Lukyanenko	Ukraine	DNS		
	Wilhelm Brem	Germany	DNS		

=== Sitting ===
The sitting event was won by Taras Kryjanovski, representing Russia.

Rank	Name	Country	Real Time	Factor	Finish Time
1st place, gold medalist(s)	Taras Kryjanovski	Russia	27:16.3	98	26:43.6
2nd place, silver medalist(s)	Sergej Shilov	Russia	31:14.6	86	26:52.1
3rd place, bronze medalist(s)	Iurii Kostiuk	Ukraine	29:52.2	91	27:10.9
4	Vladimir Kiselev	Russia	27:11.5	100	27:11.5
5	Oliver Anthofer	Austria	29:03.2	94	27:18.6
6	Enzo Masiello	Italy	29:23.4	94	27:37.6
7	Aliaksandr Davidovich	Belarus	27:45.2	100	27:45.2
8	Mikhail Terentiev	Russia	32:20.7	86	27:49.0
9	Robert Wator	Poland	27:51.2	100	27:51.2
10	Oleksandr Vasyutynsky	Ukraine	30:09.7	94	28:21.1
11	Vladyslav Morozov	Ukraine	28:29.7	100	28:29.7
12	Alain Marguerettaz	France	30:20.9	94	28:31.7
13	Sergiy Khyzhnyak	Ukraine	28:32.8	100	28:32.8
14	Vladimir Gajdiciar	Slovakia	28:36.2	100	28:36.2
15	Wieslaw Fiedor	Poland	28:42.4	100	28:42.4
16	Karl Einar Henriksen	Norway	30:55.3	94	29:04.0
17	Heinz Frei	Switzerland	33:54.5	86	29:09.7
18	Christopher Klebl	United States	31:16.9	94	29:24.3
19	Bruno Huber	Switzerland	29:25.1	100	29:25.1
20	Robert Balk	United States	30:14.5	98	29:38.2
21	Leonid Musanov	Russia	34:29.5	86	29:39.8
22	Gregory Mallory	United States	32:17.3	94	30:21.1
23	Chunshan Fu	China	30:26.1	100	30:26.1
24	Jean Thomas Boily	Canada	33:54.3	91	30:51.2
25	Kamil Rosiek	Poland	30:55.5	100	30:55.5
26	Qiu Sun	China	31:58.2	98	31:19.8
27	Ermenegildo Arnoldi	Italy	32:07.4	98	31:28.9
28	Jimmy Pelletier	Canada	37:36.4	86	32:20.5
	Ruedi Weber	Switzerland	DNS		

=== Standing ===
The standing event was won by Steven Cook, representing United States.

Rank	Name	Country	Real Time	Factor	Finish Time
1st place, gold medalist(s)	Steven Cook	United States	28:31.2	96	27:22.8
2nd place, silver medalist(s)	Alfis Makamedinov	Russia	30:25.8	92	27:59.8
3rd place, bronze medalist(s)	Kirill Mikhaylov	Russia	29:16.7	96	28:06.5
4	Kjartan Haugen	Norway	29:18.6	96	28:08.3
5	Svein Lilleberg	Norway	30:58.7	91	28:11.4
6	Iikka Tuomisto	Finland	31:41.6	92	29:09.5
7	Michael Crenshaw	United States	30:31.3	96	29:18.0
8	Thomas Oelsner	Germany	32:18.9	91	29:24.4
9	Nils Erik Ulset	Norway	33:53.4	87	29:29.1
10	Vladimir Kazakov	Russia	32:54.7	90	29:37.2
11	Kalervo Pieksaemaeki	Finland	30:59.6	96	29:45.2
12	Andreas Hustveit	Norway	32:27.1	92	29:51.4
13	Yoshihiro Nitta	Japan	32:30.4	92	29:54.4
14	Jan Kolodziej	Poland	34:44.8	87	30:13.8
15	Daniele Stefanoni	Italy	31:32.9	96	30:17.1
16	Daniel Perkins	United States	31:50.1	96	30:33.7
17	Joerg Baldauf	Germany	34:08.5	90	30:43.7
18	Emmanuel Lacroix	France	33:29.3	92	30:48.5
19	Michael Kurz	Austria	34:33.7	91	31:27.0
20	Harald Thauer	Germany	33:36.7	94	31:35.7
21	Oleg Balukhto	Russia	34:51.4	91	31:43.2
22	Jie Zhang	China	35:33.6	91	32:21.6
23	Franck Paget	France	36:03.5	91	32:48.8
24	Yannick Bourseaux	France	37:08.8	91	33:48.2
25	James Kenneth Millar	Australia	37:54.4	92	34:52.5
26	Jinyou Wang	China	38:00.3	92	34:57.8
	Oleg Syssolyatin	Kazakhstan	DQ		
	Konstantin Yanchuk	Russia	DNF		
	Siarhei Silchanka	Belarus	DNF		
	Josef Giesen	Germany	DNS		
	Sukhbaatar Nyamaa	Mongolia	DNS		
