= Biathlon at the 2006 Winter Paralympics – Women's 7.5km =

Biathlon - Women's 7.5km at the IX Paralympic Winter Games
- Venue: Pragelato
- Dates: 14 March

Women's 7.5 km biathlon events at the 2006 Winter Paralympics were contested at Pragelato on 14 March.

There were 3 events. Standings were decided by applying a disability factor to the actual times achieved; for each missed shot the competitors had to execute one 150m penalty loop, which was included in the real time.

== Visually impaired ==
The visually impaired event was won by Verena Bentele, representing Germany.

| Rank | Name | Country | Real Time | Factor | Misses | Finish Time |
|---|---|---|---|---|---|---|
| 1st place, gold medalist(s) | Verena Bentele | Germany | 31:54.9 | 85 | 5 | 27:07.6 |
| 2nd place, silver medalist(s) | Miyuki Kobayashi | Japan | 32:19.2 | 85 | 2 | 27:28.3 |
| 3rd place, bronze medalist(s) | Elvira Ibraginova | Russia | 28:28.2 | 100 | 3 | 28:28.2 |
| 4 | Tetyana Smyrnova | Ukraine | 29:03.8 | 100 | 2 | 29:03.8 |
| 5 | Anne-Mette Bredahl | Denmark | 34:34.2 | 85 | 3 | 29:23.0 |
| 6 | Zemfira Galeeva | Russia | 29:37.3 | 100 | 3 | 29:37.3 |
| 7 | Emilie Tabouret | France | 35:35.2 | 85 | 5 | 30:14.9 |
| 8 | Nathalie Morin | France | 30:40.9 | 100 | 3 | 30:40.9 |

== Sitting ==
The sitting event was won by Olena Iurkovska, representing Ukraine.

| Rank | Name | Country | Real Time | Factor | Misses | Finish Time |
|---|---|---|---|---|---|---|
| 1st place, gold medalist(s) | Olena Iurkovska | Ukraine | 28:03.4 | 100 | 0 | 28:03.4 |
| 2nd place, silver medalist(s) | Svitlana Tryfonova | Ukraine | 32:28.4 | 94 | 0 | 30:31.5 |
| 3rd place, bronze medalist(s) | Lyudmyla Pavlenko | Ukraine | 33:14.5 | 98 | 4 | 32:34.6 |
| 4 | Shauna Maria Whyte | Canada | 33:28.8 | 98 | 1 | 32:48.6 |
| 5 | Irina Polyakova | Russia | 32:50.9 | 100 | 4 | 32:50.9 |
| 6 | Monica Bascio | United States | 36:46.7 | 94 | 4 | 34:34.3 |

== Standing ==
The standing event was won by Alena Gorbunova, representing Russia.

| Rank | Name | Country | Real Time | Factor | Misses | Finish Time |
|---|---|---|---|---|---|---|
| 1st place, gold medalist(s) | Alena Gorbunova | Russia | 26:42.2 | 97 | 1 | 25:54.2 |
| 2nd place, silver medalist(s) | Anna Burmistrova | Russia | 27:29.0 | 97 | 3 | 26:39.5 |
| 3rd place, bronze medalist(s) | Anne Floriet | France | 29:18.8 | 91 | 1 | 26:40.5 |
| 4 | Katarzyna Rogowiec | Poland | 31:37.1 | 87 | 5 | 27:30.4 |
| 5 | Maija Loeytynoja | Finland | 28:44.7 | 97 | 1 | 27:53.0 |
| 6 | Shoko Ota | Japan | 29:18.2 | 97 | 1 | 28:25.4 |
| 7 | Kelly Underkofler | United States | 29:42.3 | 97 | 2 | 28:48.9 |
| 8 | Pamela Novaglio | Italy | 30:36.4 | 96 | 2 | 29:22.9 |
| 9 | Iuliia Batenkova | Ukraine | 31:07.1 | 96 | 5 | 29:52.4 |
| 10 | Iryna Kyrychenko | Ukraine | 36:45.0 | 84 | 3 | 30:52.2 |
| 11 | Anna Szarota | Poland | 34:47.6 | 96 | 7 | 33:24.1 |
| 12 | Stina Sellin | Sweden | 34:27.0 | 97 | 7 | 33:25.0 |
| 13 | Grazyna Gron | Poland | 34:34.7 | 97 | 8 | 33:32.4 |
| 14 | Momoko Dekijima | Japan | 35:03.4 | 96 | 6 | 33:39.2 |
| | Larysa Varona | Belarus | DNF | | | |
| | Chiara Devittori | Switzerland | DNS | | | |
