= Cross-country skiing at the 2006 Winter Paralympics – Men's short distance =

Cross-country skiing - Men's short at the IX Paralympic Winter Games
- Paralympic cross-country skiing
- Venue: Pragelato
- Dates: 12 March

Men's short distance cross-country free skiing events at the 2006 Winter Paralympics were contested at Pragelato on 12 March.

There were 3 events, all of 5 km distance. Standings were decided by applying a disability factor to the actual times achieved.

== Results ==
=== Visually impaired ===
The visually impaired event was won by Brian McKeever, representing Canada.

Rank	Name	Country	Real Time	Factor	Finish Time
1st place, gold medalist(s)	Brian McKeever	Canada	11:35.1	100	11:35.1
2nd place, silver medalist(s)	Frank Höfle	Germany	12:07.0	98	11:52.5
3rd place, bronze medalist(s)	Helge Flo	Norway	14:23.4	85	12:13.9
4	Wilhelm Brem	Germany	14:29.6	85	12:19.2
5	Irek Mannanov	Russia	12:19.7	100	12:19.7
6	Vasili Shaptsiaboi	Belarus	12:35.5	98	12:20.4
7	Vitaliy Lukyanenko	Ukraine	12:31.9	100	12:31.9
8	Verlay Koupchinsky	Russia	14:46.5	85	12:33.5
9	Jarmo Ollanketo	Finland	13:12.0	98	12:56.2
10	Michael Bentele	Germany	15:32.3	85	13:12.4
11	Minoru Kobayashi	Japan	15:45.5	85	13:23.7
12	Elie Zampin	France	13:25.0	100	13:25.0
13	Philippe Terral	France	13:50.7	98	13:34.1
14	Franz Gatscher	Italy	14:41.2	98	14:23.5
15	Ragnar Sorhaug	Norway	15:04.8	98	14:46.7
16	Hiroshi Kato	Japan	16:28.4	98	16:08.6
17	Aleksandar Tsokanov	Bulgaria	18:04.8	98	17:43.1
18	Ivan Ivanov	Bulgaria	18:38.4	100	18:38.4
19	Zeinolla Seitov	Kazakhstan	18:54.8	100	18:54.8
	Oleh Munts	Ukraine	DNS		

=== Sitting ===
The sitting event was won by Taras Kryjanovski, representing Russia.

Rank	Name	Country	Real Time	Factor	Finish Time
1st place, gold medalist(s)	Taras Kryjanovski	Russia	15:57.9	98	15:38.8
2nd place, silver medalist(s)	Iurii Kostiuk	Ukraine	17:12.3	91	15:39.4
3rd place, bronze medalist(s)	Alain Marguerettaz	France	17:01.0	94	15:59.7
4	Sergej Shilov	Russia	18:38.6	86	16:02.0
5	Oliver Anthofer	Austria	17:07.9	94	16:06.2
6	Vladimir Kiselev	Russia	16:26.7	100	16:26.7
7	Vladyslav Morozov	Ukraine	16:29.6	100	16:29.6
8	Aliaksandr Davidovich	Belarus	16:30.6	100	16:30.6
9	Wieslaw Fiedor	Poland	16:40.5	100	16:40.5
10	Robert Wator	Poland	16:44.7	100	16:44.7
11	Robert Balk	United States	17:06.8	98	16:46.3
12	Oleksandr Vasyutynsky	Ukraine	18:02.5	94	16:57.6
13	Bruno Huber	Switzerland	17:01.2	100	17:01.2
14	Mikhail Terentiev	Russia	19:50.2	86	17:03.6
15	Irek Zaripov	Russia	17:04.2	100	17:04.2
16	Enzo Masiello	Italy	18:12.8	94	17:07.2
17	Karl Einar Henriksen	Norway	18:20.9	94	17:14.8
18	Ruedi Weber	Switzerland	18:23.4	94	17:17.2
19	Chunshan Fu	China	17:18.6	100	17:18.6
20	Qiu Sun	China	17:55.1	98	17:33.6
21	Leonid Musanov	Russia	20:35.5	86	17:42.5
22	Heinz Frei	Switzerland	21:07.9	86	18:10.4
23	Christopher Klebl	United States	19:25.5	94	18:15.5
24	Gregory Mallory	United States	19:30.9	94	18:20.7
25	Hiroyuki Nagata	Japan	21:40.5	86	18:38.4
26	Kamil Rosiek	Poland	18:44.9	100	18:44.9
27	Jean Thomas Boily	Canada	20:55.5	91	19:02.5
28	Ermenegildo Arnoldi	Italy	19:44.0	98	19:20.4
29	Jimmy Pelletier	Canada	22:33.9	86	19:24.4

=== Standing ===
The standing event was won by Steven Cook, representing United States.

Rank	Name	Country	Real Time	Factor	Finish Time
1st place, gold medalist(s)	Steven Cook	United States	13:07.7	96	12:36.2
2nd place, silver medalist(s)	Siarhei Silchanka	Belarus	13:04.5	97	12:41.0
3rd place, bronze medalist(s)	Thomas Oelsner	Germany	13:17.2	96	12:45.3
4	Kirill Mikhaylov	Russia	13:33.2	96	13:00.6
5	Kjartan Haugen	Norway	13:36.5	96	13:03.8
6	Rustam Garifoullin	Russia	13:33.5	97	13:09.1
7	Michael Kurz	Austria	14:19.7	92	13:11.0
8	Josef Giesen	Germany	15:11.7	87	13:13.1
9	Nils Erik Ulset	Norway	14:51.5	89	13:13.4
10	Konstantin Yanchuk	Russia	15:18.1	87	13:18.8
11	Andreas Hustveit	Norway	13:44.4	97	13:19.7
12	Joerg Baldauf	Germany	14:58.0	90	13:28.2
13	Harald Thauer	Germany	14:04.3	96	13:30.5
14	Emmanuel Lacroix	France	13:59.2	97	13:34.1
15	Yannick Bourseaux	France	14:11.9	96	13:37.8
16	Iikka Tuomisto	Finland	14:07.3	97	13:41.9
17	Oleg Balukhto	Russia	14:16.7	96	13:42.4
18	Vladimir Kazakov	Russia	14:50.3	93	13:48.0
19	Svein Lilleberg	Norway	16:04.2	86	13:49.2
20	Yoshihiro Nitta	Japan	14:21.7	97	13:55.8
21	Alfis Makamedinov	Russia	15:19.8	91	13:57.1
22	James Kenneth Millar	Australia	14:38.6	97	14:12.2
23	Jan Kolodziej	Poland	18:10.9	80	14:32.7
24	Franck Paget	France	15:13.2	96	14:36.7
25	Pascal Schrofer	Switzerland	15:12.0	97	14:44.6
26	Daniel Perkins	United States	15:43.0	96	15:05.2
27	Jie Zhang	China	15:55.2	96	15:17.0
28	Michael Crenshaw	United States	16:05.6	96	15:26.9
29	Jinyou Wang	China	17:19.9	97	16:48.7
30	Oleg Syssolyatin	Kazakhstan	25:36.4	96	24:34.9
31	Sukhbaatar Nyamaa	Mongolia	33:24.8	97	32:24.7
	Valeriy Darovskikh	Russia	DNS		
