= Cross-country skiing at the 2006 Winter Paralympics – Men's long distance =

Cross-country skiing - Men's long at the IX Paralympic Winter Games
- Paralympic cross-country skiing
- Venue: Pragelato
- Dates: 18–19 March 2006

Men's long distance cross-country classic skiing events at the 2006 Winter Paralympics were contested at Pragelato on 18–19 March.

There were 3 events, of 20 km or 15 km distance. Standings were decided by applying a disability factor to the actual times achieved.

== Results ==
=== 20km Visually impaired ===
The visually impaired event took place on 19 March. It was won by Oleh Munts, representing Ukraine.

Rank	Name	Country	Real Time	Factor	Finish Time
1st place, gold medalist(s)	Oleh Munts	Ukraine	1:05:26.3	87	0:56:55.9
2nd place, silver medalist(s)	Brian McKeever	Canada	1:57:07.6	100	0:57:07.6
3rd place, bronze medalist(s)	Vasili Shaptsiaboi	Belarus	0:59:19.5	98	0:58:08.4
4	Valery Koupchinsky	Russia	1:07:02.1	87	0:58:19.2
5	Wilhelm Brem	Germany	1:07:10.6	87	0:58:26.6
6	Frank Höfle	Germany	0:59:57.2	98	0:58:45.3
7	Helge Flo	Norway	1:09:57.2	87	1:00:51.6
8	Irek Mannanov	Russia	1:01:30.9	100	1:01:30.9
9	Jarmo Ollanketo	Finland	1:04:08.6	98	1:02:51.6
10	Michael Bentele	Germany	1:13:21.4	87	1:03:49.2
11	Elie Zampin	France	1:05:08.9	100	1:05:08.9
12	Ragnar Sorhaug	Norway	1:09:52.8	98	1:08:28.9
13	Franz Gatscher	Italy	1:17:40.8	98	1:16:07.6
14	Zeinolla Seitov	Kazakhstan	1:22:00.3	100	1:22:00.3
15	Ivan Ivanov	Bulgaria	1:27:27.5	100	1:27:27.5
	Philippe Terral	France	DQ		
	Vitaliy Lukyanenko	Ukraine	DNS		
	Marian Balaz	Slovakia	DNS		

=== 15km Sitting ===
The sitting event took place on 18 March. It was won by Iurii Kostiuk, representing Ukraine.

Rank	Name	Country	Real Time	Factor	Finish Time
1st place, gold medalist(s)	Iurii Kostiuk	Ukraine	45:57.8	91	41:49.6
2nd place, silver medalist(s)	Taras Kryjanovski	Russia	43:44.4	98	42:51.9
3rd place, bronze medalist(s)	Sergej Shilov	Russia	49:59.9	86	42:59.9
4	Enzo Masiello	Italy	45:52.4	94	43:07.2
5	Vladimir Kiselev	Russia	43:30.1	100	43:30.1
6	Aliaksandr Davidovich	Belarus	43:35.1	100	43:35.1
7	Irek Zaripov	Russia	43:46.4	100	43:46.4
8	Oliver Anthofer	Austria	46:43.9	94	43:55.6
9	Mikhail Terentiev	Russia	51:14.8	86	44:04.3
10	Alain Marguerettaz	France	47:15.2	94	44:25.1
11	Christopher Klebl	United States	47:21.6	94	44:31.1
12	Robert Wator	Poland	44:43.3	100	44:43.3
13	Sergiy Khyzhnyak	Ukraine	44:44.2	100	44:44.2
14	Vladimir Gajdiciar	Slovakia	45:00.9	100	45:00.9
15	Robert Balk	United States	46:45.2	98	45:49.1
16	Wieslaw Fiedor	Poland	45:58.7	100	45:58.7
17	Oleksandr Vasyutynsky	Ukraine	49:12.1	94	46:14.9
18	Karl Einar Henriksen	Norway	49:14.3	94	46:17.0
19	Leonid Musanov	Russia	54:39.7	86	47:00.5
20	Heinz Frei	Switzerland	55:12.9	86	47:29.1
21	Bruno Huber	Switzerland	47:35.1	100	47:35.1
22	Chunshan Fu	China	47:35.8	100	47:35.8
23	Gregory Mallory	United States	50:40.7	94	47:38.3
24	Kamil Rosiek	Poland	48:00.7	100	48:00.7
25	Michael Weymann	Germany	49:22.5	100	49:22.5
26	Jean Thomas Boily	Canada	54:28.0	91	49:33.8
27	Qiu Sun	China	50:58.7	98	49:57.5
28	Ermenegildo Arnoldi	Italy	51:12.3	98	50:10.8
29	Jimmy Pelletier	Canada	59:23.2	86	51:04.4

=== 20km Standing ===
The standing event took place on 19 March. It was won by Kirill Mikhaylov, representing Russia.

Rank	Name	Country	Real Time	Factor	Finish Time
1st place, gold medalist(s)	Kirill Mikhaylov	Russia	1:01:11.1	96	0:58:44.0
2nd place, silver medalist(s)	Alfis Makamedinov	Russia	1:03:52.3	92	0:58:46.0
3rd place, bronze medalist(s)	Steven Cook	United States	1:02:11.5	96	0:59:42.0
4	Iikka Tuomisto	Finland	1:06:48.0	92	1:01:27.4
5	Yoshihiro Nitta	Japan	1:07:00.9	92	1:01:39.3
6	Svein Lilleberg	Norway	1:07:45.7	91	1:01:39.8
7	Jan Kolodziej	Poland	1:11:10.7	87	1:01:55.5
8	Kjartan Haugen	Norway	1:04:36.7	96	1:02:01.6
9	Vladimir Kazakov	Russia	1:09:49.3	90	1:02:50.3
10	Siarhei Silchanka	Belarus	1:08:35.0	92	1:03:05.8
11	Andreas Hustveit	Norway	1:08:44.1	92	1:03:14.1
12	Konstantin Yanchuk	Russia	1:20:09.2	79	1:03:19.2
13	Thomas Oelsner	Germany	1:10:08.7	91	1:03:49.9
14	Nils Erik Ulset	Norway	1:14:10.2	87	1:04:31.7
15	Joerg Baldauf	Germany	1:11:56.0	90	1:04:44.4
16	Michael Crenshaw	United States	1:08:00.4	96	1:05:17.2
17	Daniele Stefanoni	Italy	1:08:44.1	96	1:05:59.1
18	Kalervo Pieksaemaeki	Finland	1:08:48.1	96	1:06:03.0
19	Daniel Perkins	United States	1:09:50.5	96	1:07:02.9
20	Harald Thauer	Germany	1:12:58.3	94	1:08:35.6
21	Jie Zhang	China	1:15:29.3	91	1:08:41.7
22	Emmanuel Lacroix	France	1:14:59.5	92	1:08:59.5
23	Yannick Bourseaux	France	1:16:13.0	91	1:09:21.4
24	James Kenneth Millar	Australia	1:19:11.6	92	1:12:51.5
25	Franck Paget	France	1:21:02.6	91	1:13:45.0
26	Jinyou Wang	China	1:24:52.9	92	1:18:05.4
27	Oleg Syssolyatin	Kazakhstan	1:56:48.3	91	1:46:17.5
	Josef Giesen	Germany			
