= Biathlon at the 2006 Winter Paralympics – Men's 12.5km =

Biathlon - Men's 12.5km at the IX Paralympic Winter Games
- Venue: Pragelato
- Dates: 11 March

Men's 12.5 km biathlon events at the 2006 Winter Paralympics were contested at Pragelato on 11 March.

There were three events, and standings were determined by applying a disability factor to the actual times achieved. Additionally, for each missed shot, a penalty of one minute was added to the calculated time.

== Visually impaired ==
The visually impaired event was won by Vitaliy Lukyanenko, representing Ukraine.

Rank	Name	Country	Real Time	Factor	Misses	Finish Time
1st place, gold medalist(s)	Vitaliy Lukyanenko	Ukraine	36:54.9	100	2	38:54.9
2nd place, silver medalist(s)	Irek Mannanov	Russia	36:15.4	100	3	39:15.4
3rd place, bronze medalist(s)	Wilhelm Brem	Germany	42:49.6	85	5	41:24.2
4	Oleh Munts	Ukraine	45:32.1	85	3	41:42.3
5	Michael Bentele	Germany	46:00.1	85	5	44:06.0
6	Marian Balaz	Slovakia	39:02.8	98	6	44:15.9
7	Philippe Terral	France	42:29.0	98	4	45:38.0
8	Brian McKeever	Canada	38:05.0	100	9	47:05.0
9	Vasili Shaptsiaboi	Belarus	40:06.3	98	11	50:18.2
10	Jarmo Ollanketo	Finland	41:41.5	98	10	50:51.4
11	Minoru Kobayashi	Japan	51:58.7	85	8	52:10.9
12	Elie Zampin	France	41:58.4	100	12	53:58.4
13	Franz Gatscher	Italy	50:57.4	98	10	59:56.2
14	Hiroshi Kato	Japan	52:28.8	98	9	1:00:25.8

== Sitting ==
The sitting event was won by Vladimir Kiselev, representing Russia.

Rank	Name	Country	Real Time	Factor	Misses	Finish Time
1st place, gold medalist(s)	Vladimir Kiselev	Russia	46:46.5	100	0	46:46.5
2nd place, silver medalist(s)	Taras Kryjanovski	Russia	44:28.1	98	4	47:34.7
3rd place, bronze medalist(s)	Mikhail Terentiev	Russia	52:37.2	86	4	49:15.2
4	Iurii Kostiuk	Ukraine	49:47.5	91	4	49:18.6
5	Sergej Shilov	Russia	52:43.0	86	4	49:20.2
6	Vladyslav Morozov	Ukraine	45:54.9	100	4	49:54.9
7	Irek Zaripov	Russia	45:57.9	100	5	50:57.9
8	Vladimir Gajdiciar	Slovakia	47:14.3	100	4	51:14.3
9	Ruedi Weber	Switzerland	51:24.3	94	3	51:19.2
10	Oleksandr Vasyutynsky	Ukraine	50:08.1	94	7	54:07.7
11	Bruno Huber	Switzerland	48:15.1	100	6	54:15.1
12	Sergiy Khyzhnyak	Ukraine	46:27.3	100	8	54:27.3
13	Hiroyuki Nagata	Japan	58:51.8	86	4	54:37.3
14	Wieslaw Fiedor	Poland	47:11.7	100	8	55:11.7
15	Leonid Musanov	Russia	55:56.3	86	10	58:06.5
16	Michael Weymann	Germany	51:05.9	100	11	2:05.9
17	Oliver Anthofer	Austria	50:09.4	94	15	2:08.8

== Standing ==
The standing event was won by Rustam Garifoullin, representing Russia.

Rank	Name	Country	Real Time	Factor	Misses	Finish Time
1st place, gold medalist(s)	Rustam Garifoullin	Russia	37:26.1	97	4	40:18.7
2nd place, silver medalist(s)	Alfis Makamedinov	Russia	43:51.2	91	1	40:54.4
3rd place, bronze medalist(s)	Nils Erik Ulset	Norway	43:55.2	89	2	41:05.3
4	Valeriy Darovskikh	Russia	40:27.2	97	2	41:14.4
5	Pascal Schrofer	Switzerland	42:31.3	97	0	41:14.8
6	Siarhei Silchanka	Belarus	38:30.2	97	5	42:20.9
7	Konstantin Yanchuk	Russia	45:37.3	87	3	42:41.4
8	Josef Giesen	Germany	43:30.2	87	5	42:50.9
9	Michael Kurz	Austria	40:57.0	92	6	43:40.4
10	Andreas Hustveit	Norway	39:28.7	97	6	44:17.6
11	Yannick Bourseaux	France	40:28.4	96	7	45:51.3
12	Joerg Baldauf	Germany	46:48.9	90	4	46:08.0
13	Emmanuel Lacroix	France	41:31.9	97	6	46:17.2
14	Thomas Oelsner	Germany	40:31.1	96	8	46:53.8
15	Harald Thauer	Germany	42:51.4	96	7	48:08.6
16	Kalervo Pieksaemaeki	Finland	45:21.1	96	5	48:32.2
17	Hiroshi Denda	Japan	46:13.3	97	4	48:50.1
18	Franck Paget	France	43:15.6	96	9	50:31.8
19	Daniele Stefanoni	Italy	44:27.9	96	9	51:41.2
20	James Kenneth Millar	Australia	45:04.9	97	10	53:43.7
	Daniel Perkins	United States	DNF			
