= Biathlon at the 2006 Winter Paralympics – Women's 10km/12.5km =

Biathlon - Women's 10km & 12.5km at the IX Paralympic Winter Games
- Venue: Pragelato
- Dates: 11 March

Women's 10 km & 12.5 km biathlon events at the 2006 Winter Paralympics were contested at Pragelato on 11 March.

There were 3 events, that for sitting competitors over 10 km and those for visually impaired & standing competitors over 12.5 km. Standings were decided by applying a disability factor to the actual times achieved, and for each missed shot a penalty of one minute was added to the calculated time.

== 12.5km Visually impaired ==
The visually impaired event was won by Miyuki Kobayashi, representing Japan.

Rank	Name	Country	Real Time	Factor	Misses	Finish Time
1st place, gold medalist(s)	Miyuki Kobayashi	Japan	56:33.5	85	1	49:04.5
2nd place, silver medalist(s)	Tetyana Smyrnova	Ukraine	49:30.5	100	3	52:30.5
3rd place, bronze medalist(s)	Verena Bentele	Germany	51:14.7	85	9	52:33.5
4	Anne-Mette Bredahl	Denmark	57:14.5	85	4	52:39.3
5	Elvira Ibraginova	Russia	46:57.1	100	9	55:57.1
6	Tatiana Ilioutchenko	Russia	47:19.0	100	11	58:19.0
7	Emilie Tabouret	France	56:59.5	85	10	58:26.6
8	Zemfira Galeeva	Russia	52:28.8	100	6	58:28.8
9	Nathalie Morin	France	52:52.7	100	8	1:00:52.7

== 10km Sitting ==
The sitting event was won by Olena Iurkovska, representing Ukraine.

Rank	Name	Country	Real Time	Factor	Misses	Finish Time
1st place, gold medalist(s)	Olena Iurkovska	Ukraine	35:09.1	100	6	41:09.1
2nd place, silver medalist(s)	Lyudmyla Pavlenko	Ukraine	38:11.0	98	5	42:25.1
3rd place, bronze medalist(s)	Svitlana Tryfonova	Ukraine	42:05.0	94	7	46:33.5
4	Irina Polyakova	Russia	38:38.9	100	8	46:38.9
5	Monica Bascio	United States	43:37.7	94	10	51:00.6
6	Liudmila Vauchok	Belarus	39:13.8	94	19	55:52.6
	Shauna Maria Whyte	Canada	DNF			

== 12.5km Standing ==
The standing event was won by Anne Floriet, representing France.

Rank	Name	Country	Real Time	Factor	Misses	Finish Time
1st place, gold medalist(s)	Anne Floriet	France	49:10.7	91	3	47:45.1
2nd place, silver medalist(s)	Iuliia Batenkova	Ukraine	48:47.4	96	4	50:50.3
3rd place, bronze medalist(s)	Shoko Ota	Japan	50:06.4	97	4	52:36.2
4	Kelly Underkofler	United States	48:36.8	97	6	53:09.3
5	Anna Burmistrova	Russia	46:48.9	97	8	53:24.6
6	Katarzyna Rogowiec	Poland	51:43.2	87	9	53:59.8
7	Pamela Novaglio	Italy	51:26.3	96	5	54:22.9
8	Anna Szarota	Poland	54:21.4	96	4	56:10.9
9	Chiara Devittori	Switzerland	50:12.5	96	9	57:12.0
10	Alena Gorbunova	Russia	51:02.2	97	9	58:30.3
11	Iryna Kyrychenko	Ukraine	59:29.3	84	11	1:00:58.2
12	Grazyna Gron	Poland	52:00.2	97	15	1:05:26.6
