= Biathlon at the 2006 Winter Paralympics – Men's 7.5km =

Biathlon - Men's 7.5km at the IX Paralympic Winter Games
- Venue: Pragelato
- Dates: 14 March

Men's 7.5 km biathlon events at the 2006 Winter Paralympics were contested at Pragelato on 11 March.

There were 3 events. Standings were decided by applying a disability factor to the actual times achieved; for each missed shot the competitors had to execute one 150m penalty loop, which was included in the real time.

== Visually impaired ==
The visually impaired event was won by Irek Mannanov, representing Russia.

Rank	Name	Country	Real Time	Factor	Misses	Finish Time
1st place, gold medalist(s)	Irek Mannanov	Russia	20:54.1	100	2	20:54.1
2nd place, silver medalist(s)	Vitaliy Lukyanenko	Ukraine	21:56.8	100	2	21:56.8
3rd place, bronze medalist(s)	Brian McKeever	Canada	22:59.4	100	7	22:59.4
4	Marian Balaz	Slovakia	23:56.1	98	3	23:27.4
5	Wilhelm Brem	Germany	28:00.3	85	6	23:48.3
6	Michael Bentele	Germany	28:17.3	85	4	24:02.7
7	Jarmo Ollanketo	Finland	25:27.9	98	3	24:57.4
8	Oleh Munts	Ukraine	29:27.9	85	7	25:02.7
9	Philippe Terral	France	26:00.3	98	4	25:29.1
10	Elie Zampin	France	26:45.9	100	7	26:45.9
11	Minoru Kobayashi	Japan	32:42.9	85	7	27:48.5
12	Hiroshi Kato	Japan	30:01.0	98	3	29:25.0
13	Franz Gatscher	Italy	31:43.9	98	8	31:05.8
14	Ivan Ivanov	Bulgaria	36:05.1	100	8	36:05.1

== Sitting ==
The sitting event was won by Vladimir Kiselev, representing Russia.

Rank	Name	Country	Real Time	Factor	Misses	Finish Time
1st place, gold medalist(s)	Vladimir Kiselev	Russia	25:19.1	100	0	25:19.1
2nd place, silver medalist(s)	Iurii Kostiuk	Ukraine	28:22.8	91	2	25:49.5
3rd place, bronze medalist(s)	Sergiy Khyzhnyak	Ukraine	25:51.2	100	0	25:51.2
4	Irek Zaripov	Russia	26:04.9	100	0	26:04.9
5	Vladimir Gajdiciar	Slovakia	26:06.5	100	0	26:06.5
6	Taras Kryjanovski	Russia	26:41.4	98	2	26:09.3
7	Ruedi Weber	Switzerland	28:59.3	94	1	27:14.9
8	Mikhail Terentiev	Russia	31:50.4	86	3	27:22.9
9	Oliver Anthofer	Austria	29:17.5	94	4	27:32.0
10	Vladyslav Morozov	Ukraine	27:35.8	100	1	27:35.8
11	Sergej Shilov	Russia	32:35.9	86	4	28:02.1
12	Robert Wator	Poland	28:13.3	100	4	28:13.3
13	Bruno Huber	Switzerland	29:01.4	100	3	29:01.4
14	Hiroyuki Nagata	Japan	33:45.9	86	0	29:02.3
15	Aliaksandr Davidovich	Belarus	29:20.5	100	6	29:20.5
16	Michael Weymann	Germany	29:37.2	100	1	29:37.2
17	Leonid Musanov	Russia	36:37.6	86	4	31:29.9
	Wieslaw Fiedor	Poland	DNS			

== Standing ==
The standing event was won by Rustam Garifoullin, representing Russia.

Rank	Name	Country	Real Time	Factor	Misses	Finish Time
1st place, gold medalist(s)	Rustam Garifoullin	Russia	21:57.2	97	2	21:17.7
2nd place, silver medalist(s)	Josef Giesen	Germany	24:29.8	87	1	21:18.7
3rd place, bronze medalist(s)	Nils Erik Ulset	Norway	24:50.0	89	2	22:06.1
4	Valeriy Darovskikh	Russia	22:47.4	97	0	22:06.3
5	Thomas Oelsner	Germany	23:06.9	96	1	22:11.4
6	Michael Kurz	Austria	24:32.7	92	3	22:34.9
7	Siarhei Silchanka	Belarus	23:43.0	97	4	23:00.3
8	Harald Thauer	Germany	24:11.4	96	2	23:13.3
9	Yannick Bourseaux	France	24:20.3	96	3	23:21.9
10	Emmanuel Lacroix	France	24:05.4	97	2	23:22.0
11	Konstantin Yanchuk	Russia	27:01.0	87	4	23:30.3
12	Alfis Makamedinov	Russia	25:51.4	91	1	23:31.8
13	Franck Paget	France	25:34.9	96	3	24:33.5
14	Hiroshi Denda	Japan	25:26.9	97	1	24:41.1
15	Oleg Balukhto	Russia	25:46.5	96	5	24:44.7
16	Daniele Stefanoni	Italy	26:42.6	96	2	25:38.5
17	Kalervo Pieksaemaeki	Finland	26:43.3	96	2	25:39.1
18	James Kenneth Millar	Australia	27:18.9	97	3	26:29.8
19	Pascal Schrofer	Switzerland	27:26.0	97	4	26:36.6
20	Daniel Perkins	United States	29:46.1	96	8	28:34.6
21	Oleg Syssolyatin	Kazakhstan	40:34.3	96	6	38:57.0
	Jan Kolodziej	Poland	DNS			
