= Para cross-country skiing at the 2006 Winter Paralympics =

Cross-country skiing at the IX Paralympic Winter Games
- Venue: Pragelato

At the 2006 Winter Paralympics, 20 cross-country skiing events were contested at Pragelato.

== Medal table ==
Rank	Nation	Gold	Silver	Bronze	Total
1	Russia (RUS)	7	9	6	22
2	Ukraine (UKR)	4	3	6	13
3	Canada (CAN)	2	1	2	5
4	United States (USA)	2	0	1	3
5	Poland (POL)	2	0	0	2
6	Belarus (BLR)	1	6	2	9
7	Germany (GER)	1	1	1	3
8	Norway (NOR)	1	0	1	2
9	France (FRA)	0	0	1	1
Totals (9 entries)		20	20	20	60

== Events ==
Men

- 5 km
  - Sitting
  - Standing
  - Visually impaired
- 10 km
  - Sitting
  - Standing
  - Visually impaired
- 15 km
  - Sitting
- 20 km
  - Standing
  - Visually impaired
- 1×3.75 km + 2×5 km relay
  - open

Women

- 2.5 km
  - Sitting
- 5 km
  - Standing
  - Visually impaired
  - Sitting
- 10 km
  - Standing
  - Visually impaired
  - Sitting
- 15 km
  - Standing
  - Visually impaired
- 3×2.5 km relay
  - open

== Men's events ==
=== Men's short distance ===
Event	Class	Gold		Silver		Bronze	
Men's 5 km	Sitting	Taras Kryjanovski (RUS)	15:38.8	Iurii Kostiuk (UKR)	15:39.4	Alain Marguerettaz (FRA)	15:59.7
Men's 5 km	Standing	Steve Cook (USA)	12:36.2	Siarhei Silchanka (BLR)	12:41.0	Thomas Oelsner (GER)	12:45.3
Men's 5 km	Visually Impaired	Brian McKeever (CAN) guide: Robin McKeever	11:35.1	Frank Hoefle (GER) guide: Johanne Wachlin	11:52.5	Helge Flo (NOR) guide: Thomas Losnegard (NOR)	12:13.9

=== Men's middle distance ===
Event	Class	Gold		Silver		Bronze	
;Men's 10 km	Sitting	Taras Kryjanovski (RUS)	26:43.6	Sergej Shilov (RUS)	26:52.1	Iurii Kostiuk (UKR)	27:10.9
;Men's 10 km	Standing	Steve Cook (USA)	27:22.8	Alfis Makamedinov (RUS)	27:59.8	Kirill Mikhaylov (RUS)	28:06.5
;Men's 10 km	Visually Impaired	Brian McKeever (CAN) guide: Robin McKeever	26:09.5	Vasili Shaptsiaboi (BLR) guide: Mikalai Shablousk	26:55.5	Valery Koupchinsky (RUS) guide: Viatcheslav Doubov	27:10.2

=== Men's long distance ===
Event	Class	Gold		Silver		Bronze	
;Men's 15 km - Sitting	Sitting	Iurii Kostiuk (UKR)	41:49.6	Taras Kryjanovski (RUS)	42:51.9	Sergej Shilov (RUS)	42:59.9

Event	Class	Gold		Silver		Bronze	
Men's 20 km	Standing	Kirill Mikhaylov (RUS)	58:44.3	Alfis Makamedinov (RUS)	58:45.8	Steve Cook (USA)	59:42.2
Men's 20 km	Visually Impaired	Oleh Munts (UKR) guide: Bory Babar	56:55.9	Brian McKeever (CAN) guide: Robin McKeever	57:07.6	Vasili Shaptsiaboi (BLR) guide: Mikalai Shablousk	58:08.4

=== Men's relay 1x3.75 km + 2x5 km ===
Event	Class	Gold		Silver		Bronze	
Men's relay	1x3.75 km + 2x5 km	Norway (NOR); Kjartan Haugen; Karl Einar Henriksen; Andreas Hustveit	39:58.5	Russia (RUS); Rustam Garifoullin; Irek Mannanov guide: Rostislav Pavlov; Sergej Shilov	40:00.1	Ukraine (UKR); Vitaliy Lukyanenko guide: Volodymyr Ivanov; Vladyslav Morozov; Oleh Munts guide: Bory Babar	40:06.9

== Women's events ==
=== Women's short distance ===
Event	Class	Gold		Silver		Bronze	
Women's 2.5 km	Sitting	Olena Iurkovska (UKR)	8:27.9	Liudmila Vauchok (BLR)	8:46.5	Lyudmyla Pavlenko (UKR)	8:54.0
Women's 2.5 km	Standing	Katarzyna Rogowiec (POL)	15:00.7	Anna Burmistrova (RUS)	15:28.0	Yuliya Batenkova (UKR)	15:45.6
Women's 2.5 km	Visually Impaired	Verena Bentele (GER) guide: Franz Lankes	14:22.1	Tatiana Ilyuchenko (RUS) guide: Valeriy Koshkin	14:55.9	Lioubov Vasilieva (RUS) guide: Viatcheslav Goldinov	15:13.5

=== Women's middle distance ===
Event	Class	Gold		Silver		Bronze	
Women's 5 km	Sitting	Olena Iurkovska (UKR)	16:39.7	Liudmila Vauchok (BLR)	17:12.8	Colette Bourgonje (CAN)	17:18.7
Women's 5 km	Standing	Anna Burmistrova (RUS)	34:12.2	Yuliya Batenkova (UKR)	34:30.8	Anne Floriet (FRA)	34:39.3
Women's 5 km	Visually Impaired	Lioubov Vasilieva (RUS) guide: Viatcheslav Goldinov	32:40.6	Tatiana Ilyuchenko (RUS) guide: Valeriy Koshkin	33:00.8	Yadviha Skarabahataya (BLR) guide: Vasili Hallrukovich	33:39.9

=== Women's long distance ===
Event	Class	Gold		Silver		Bronze	
Women's 10 km	Sitting	Liudmila Vauchok (BLR)	30:54.5	Olena Iurkovska (UKR)	31:50.9	Colette Bourgonje (CAN)	32:18.8
Women's 15 km	Standing	Katarzyna Rogowiec (POL)	52:41.0	Anna Burmistrova (RUS)	54:29.1	Yuliya Batenkova (UKR)	55:20.0
Women's 15 km	Visually Impaired	Lioubov Vasilieva (RUS) guide: Viatcheslav Goldinov	52:52.9	Yadviha Skarabahataya (BLR) guide: Vasili Hallrukovich	53:21.1	Tatiana Ilyuchenko (RUS) guide: Valeriy Koshkin	53:31.0

=== Women's relay 3x2.5 km ===
Event	Class	Gold		Silver		Bronze	
Women's relay 3x2.5 km	Mixed	Russia (RUS); Tatiana Ilyuchenko guide: Valeriy Koshkin; Irina Polyakova; Lioubov Vasilieva guide: Viatcheslav Goldinov	23:31.4	Belarus (BLR); Yadviha Skarabahataya guide: Vasili Hallrukovich; Larysa Varona; Liudmila Vauchok	24:10.1	Ukraine (UKR); Yuliya Batenkova; Olena Iurkovska; Lyudmyla Pavlenko	24:54.5

== See also ==
- Cross-country skiing at the 2006 Winter Olympics
