= Cross-country skiing at the 2006 Winter Paralympics – Men's 1 × 3.75 km + 2 × 5 km Relay =

Men's 1x3.75/2x5 km relay open at the IX Paralympic Winter Games
- Paralympic cross-country skiing
- Venue: Pragelato
- Dates: 17 March 2006
- Competitors: 10 from 9 nations

Medalists
1st place, gold medalist(s)		Andreas Hustveit; Karl Einar Henriksen; Kjartan Haugen	Norway
2nd place, silver medalist(s)		Irek Mannanov; Rustam Garifoullin; Sergej Shilov	Russia
3rd place, bronze medalist(s)		Vladyslav Morozov; Vitaliy Lukyanenko; Oleh Munts	Ukraine

The men's 1x3.75/2x5 km relay open cross-country skiing competition at the 2006 Winter Paralympics was held on 17 March at Pragelato.

The event was won by the team representing Norway.

== Results ==
Rank	Country	Time
1	Norway	39:58.50
2	Russia	40:00.10
3	Ukraine	40:06.90
4	Germany	40:08.30
5	Russia (2)	40:52.90
6	United States	40:58.00
7	France	41:56.50
8	Italy	42:35.90
9	China	46:55.80
10	Japan	47:29.20

== Team Lists ==
Norway: Andreas Hustveit; Karl Einar Henriksen; Kjartan Haugen	Russia: Irek Mannanov; Rustam Garifoullin; Sergej Shilov	Ukraine: Vladyslav Morozov; Vitaliy Lukyanenko; Oleh Munts	Germany: Frank Höfle; Michael Weymann; Wilhelm Brem
Russia (2): Alfis Makamedinov; Kirill Mikhaylov; Vladimir Kiselev	United States: Steven Cook; Michael Crenshaw; Christopher Klebl	France: Alain Marguerettaz; Philippe Terral; Yannick Bourseaux	Italy: Franz Gatscher; Enzo Masiello; Daniele Stefanoni
China: Fu Chunshan; Zhang Jie; Wang Jinyou	Japan: Hiroshi Denda; Hiroshi Kato; Hiroyuki Nagata		
