= Cross-country skiing at the 2006 Winter Paralympics – Women's 3 × 2.5 km Relay =

Women's 3x2.5 km relay open at the IX Paralympic Winter Games
- Paralympic cross-country skiing
- Venue: Pragelato
- Dates: 17 March 2006
- Competitors: 8

Medalists
1st place, gold medalist(s)		Irina Polyakova; Lioubov Vasilieva; Tatiana Ilioutchenko	Russia
2nd place, silver medalist(s)		Larysa Varona; Liudmila Vauchok; Yadviha Skarabahataya	Belarus
3rd place, bronze medalist(s)		Yuliya Batenkova; Olena Iurkovska; Lyudmyla Pavlenko	Ukraine

The women's 3x2.5 km relay open cross-country skiing competition at the 2006 Winter Paralympics was held on 17 March at Pragelato.

The event was won by the team representing Russia.

== Results ==
Rank	Country	Time
1	Russia	23:31.40
2	Belarus	24:10.10
3	Ukraine	24:54.50
4	France	26:27.00
5	Japan	26:36.90
6	Poland	27:23.70
7	United States	27:36.80
8	China	28:28.00

== Team Lists ==
Russia: Irina Polyakova; Lioubov Vasilieva; Tatiana Ilioutchenko	Belarus: Larysa Varona; Liudmila Vauchok; Yadviha Skarabahataya	Ukraine: Yuliya Batenkova; Olena Iurkovska; Lyudmyla Pavlenko	France: Anne Floriet; Emilie Tabouret; Nathalie Morin
Japan: Shoko Ota; Momoko Dekijima; Miyuki Kobayashi	Poland: Anna Szarota; Grazyna Gron; Katarzyna Rogowiec	United States: Monica Bascio; Kelly Underkofler; Candace Cable	China: Han Lixia; Zhang Nannan; Peng Yuanyuan
