= Ukraine at the 2006 Winter Paralympics =

- IPC code: UKR
- NPC: National Paralympic Committee of Ukraine
- Website: www.paralympic.org.ua

in Turin
- Competitors: 12 (6 men, 6 women) in 2 sports
- Medals Ranked 3rd: Gold 7 Silver 9 Bronze 9 Total 25

Winter Paralympics appearances (overview)
- 1998; 2002; 2006; 2010; 2014; 2018; 2022; 2026

Other related appearances
- Soviet Union (1988); Unified Team (1992)

Ukraine participated at the 2006 Winter Paralympics held in Turin, Italy, held between 10 and 19 March 2006. The country's participation in the Games marked its third appearance at the Winter Olympics since its debut in the 1998 Games.

The Ukrainian team consisted of 12 athletes who all competed in two sports. Ukraine was ranked third in the overall medal table with 25 medals including seven gold, nine silver and nine bronze medals. Olena Iurkovska won six medals including four gold medals.

== Background ==
Ukraine competed as a part of the Soviet Union until 1998. While the nation competed as an independent entity for the first time in the 1994 Winter Olympics, it made its Winter Paralympics debut only in 1998. After the nation made its debut in the Winter Paralympics in 1998, this edition of the Games marked the nation's third appearance at the Winter Paralympic Games. The National Paralympic Committee of Ukraine is organizing body for the Winter Paralympics in Ukraine. The 2006 Winter Paralympics took place in Turin, Italy, between 10 and 19 March 2006. The event saw a participation of 474 Para athletes (375 men and 99 women) from 38 countries in 58 medal events across five sports.

== Medalists ==
Ukraine was ranked third in the overall medal table with 25 medals including seven gold, nine silver and nine bronze medals. Olena Iurkovska won six medals including four gold medals. Other multiple medal winners included Iurii Kostiuk, Vitaliy Lukyanenko, Oleh Munts, Iuliia Batenkova, Lyudmyla Pavlenko, and Svitlana Tryfonova. Following her medal exploits in the competition, Iurkovska was awarded the Whang Youn Dai Achievement Award at the end of the event.

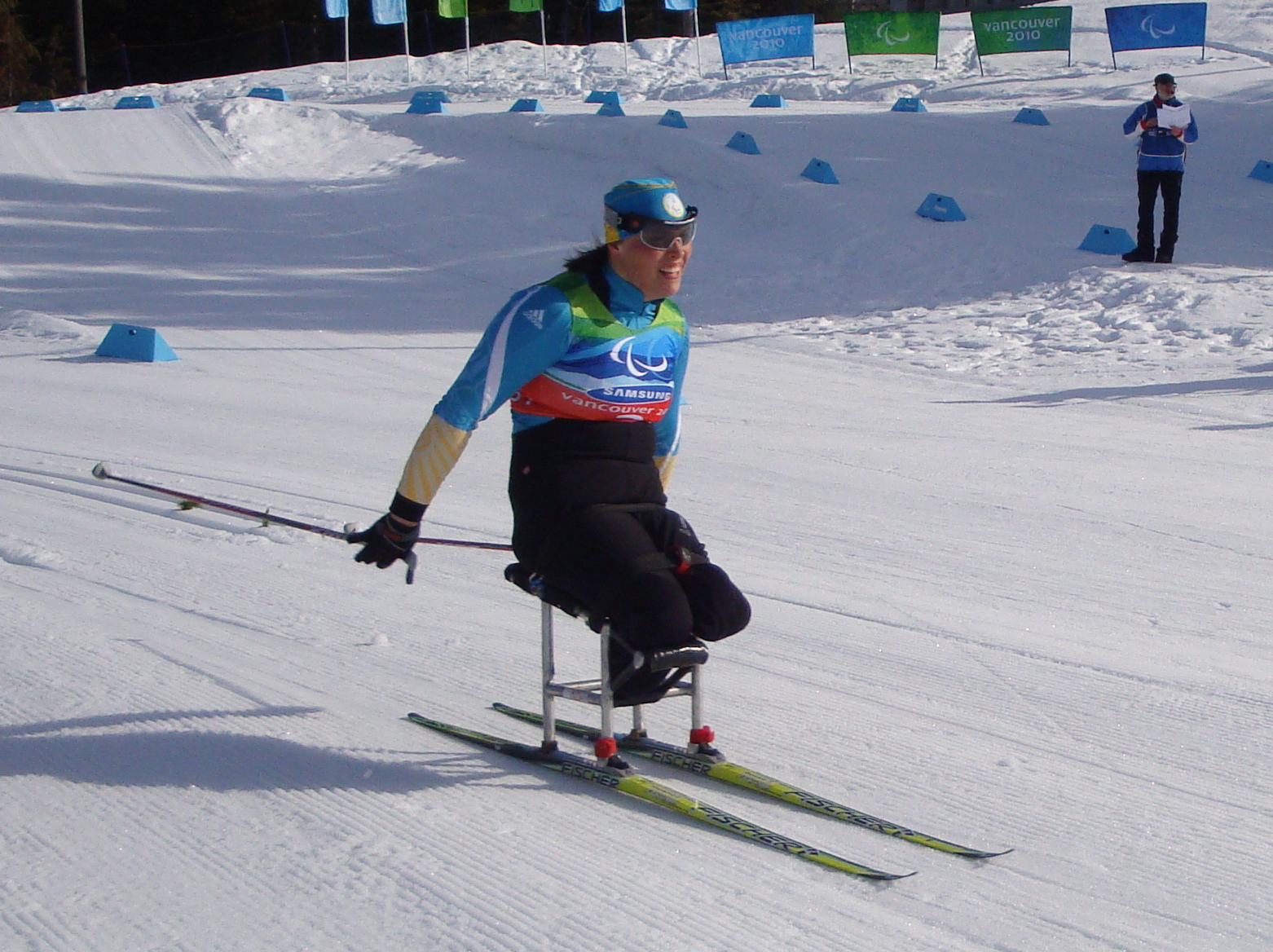
Olena Iurkovska won six medals including four gold medals

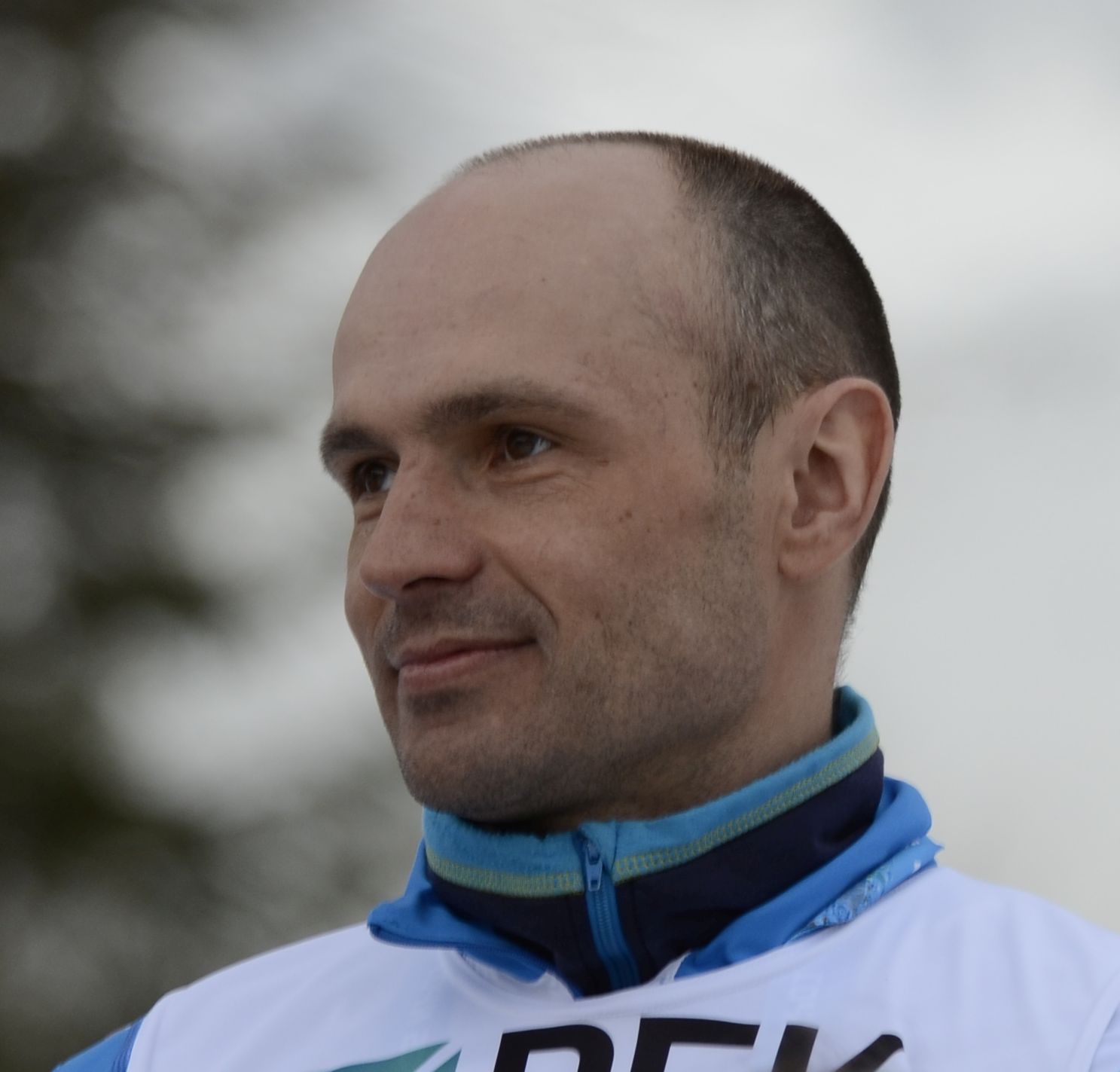
Vitaliy Lukyanenko won a gold medal in the biathlon event

Medal	Name	Sport	Event	Date
Gold	Olena Iurkovska	Biathlon	Women's 10 km, sitting	11 March
Gold	Vitaliy Lukyanenko	Biathlon	Men's 12.5 km, visually impaired	11 March
Gold	Olena Iurkovska	Cross-country skiing	Women's short distance, sitting	12 March
Gold	Olena Iurkovska	Biathlon	Women's 7.5 km, sitting	14 March
Gold	Olena Iurkovska	Cross-country skiing	Women's middle distance, sitting	15 March
Gold	Iurii Kostiuk	Cross-country skiing	Men's long distance, sitting	18 March
Gold	Oleh Munts	Cross-country skiing	Men's long distance, visually impaired	19 March
Silver	Lyudmyla Pavlenko	Biathlon	Women's 10 km, sitting	11 March
Silver	Tetyana Smyrnova	Biathlon	Women's 12.5 km, visually impaired	11 March
Silver	Iuliia Batenkova	Biathlon	Women's 12.5 km, standing	11 March
Silver	Iurii Kostiuk	Cross-country skiing	Men's short distance, sitting	12 March
Silver	Svitlana Tryfonova	Biathlon	Women's 7.5 km, sitting	14 March
Silver	Iurii Kostiuk	Biathlon	Men's 7.5 km, sitting	14 March
Silver	Vitaliy Lukyanenko	Biathlon	Men's 7.5 km, visually impaired	14 March
Silver	Iuliia Batenkova	Cross-country skiing	Women's middle distance, standing	15 March
Silver	Olena Iurkovska	Cross-country skiing	Women's long distance, sitting	18 March
Bronze	Svitlana Tryfonova	Biathlon	Women's 10 km, sitting	11 March
Bronze	Lyudmyla Pavlenko	Cross-country skiing	Women's short distance, sitting	12 March
Bronze	Iuliia Batenkova	Cross-country skiing	Women's short distance, standing	12 March
Bronze	Lyudmyla Pavlenko	Biathlon	Women's 7.5 km, sitting	14 March
Bronze	Sergiy Khyzhnyak	Biathlon	Men's 7.5 km, sitting	14 March
Bronze	Iurii Kostiuk	Cross-country skiing	Men's middle distance, sitting	15 March
Bronze	Iuliia Batenkova; Olena Iurkovska; Lyudmyla Pavlenko	Cross-country skiing	Women's 3 × 2.5 km relay	17 March
Bronze	Vitaliy Lukyanenko; Vladyslav Morozov; Oleh Munts	Cross-country skiing	Men's 1 × 3.75 km + 2 × 5 km relay	17 March
Bronze	Iuliia Batenkova	Cross-country skiing	Women's long distance, standing	19 March

== Competitors ==
The Ukrainian delegation consisted of 12 athletes who all competed in two sports.

Sport	Men	Women	Athletes
Biathlon	6	6	12
Cross-country skiing	6	6	12
Total	6	6	12 (Note: The total count of athletes will not match the tally of individual sports as all the athletes competed in both the sports.)

== Biathlon ==
Biathlon competitions were held between 11 and 14 March. Six men and six women represented Ukraine in the Biathlon competition. The biathlon event typically consists of skiing over a 2.5 km (1.6 mi) course multiple times depending on the race distance. Between the skiing stages, athletes try and hit five targets located at a distance of 10 m (33 ft) at the shooting range. For each missed target, a one-minute time penalty is added. A disability factor is applied if people with different kinds of disability participate in a single event.

The Ukrainian team won three gold, six silver, and three bronze medals in the biathlon events. Olena Iurkovska won two gold medals in the women's 7.5 km and 10 km sitting events. Vitaliy Lukyanenko won the other gold medal in the 12.5 km category.

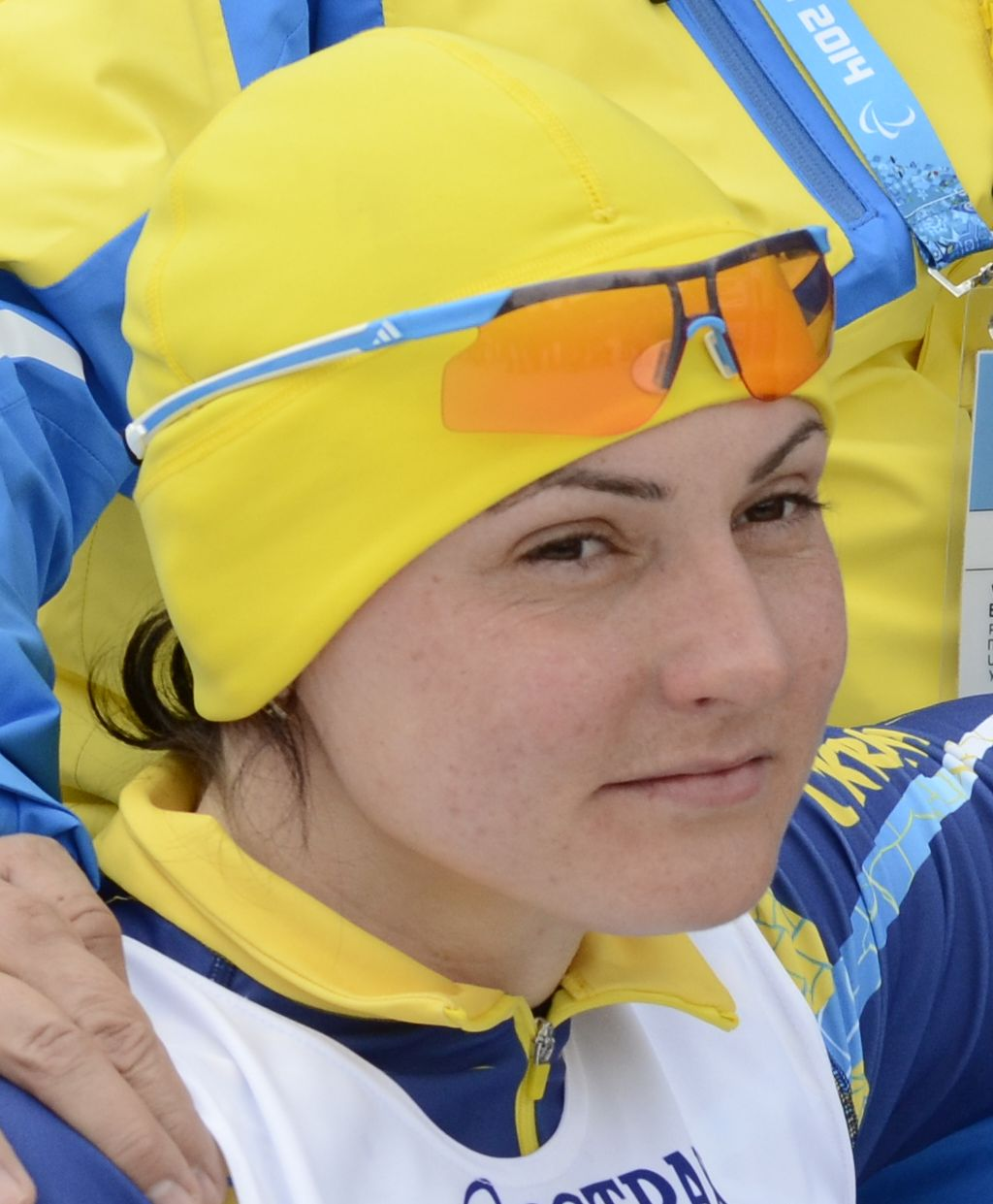
Lyudmyla Pavlenko won a silver and bronze in the biathlon event

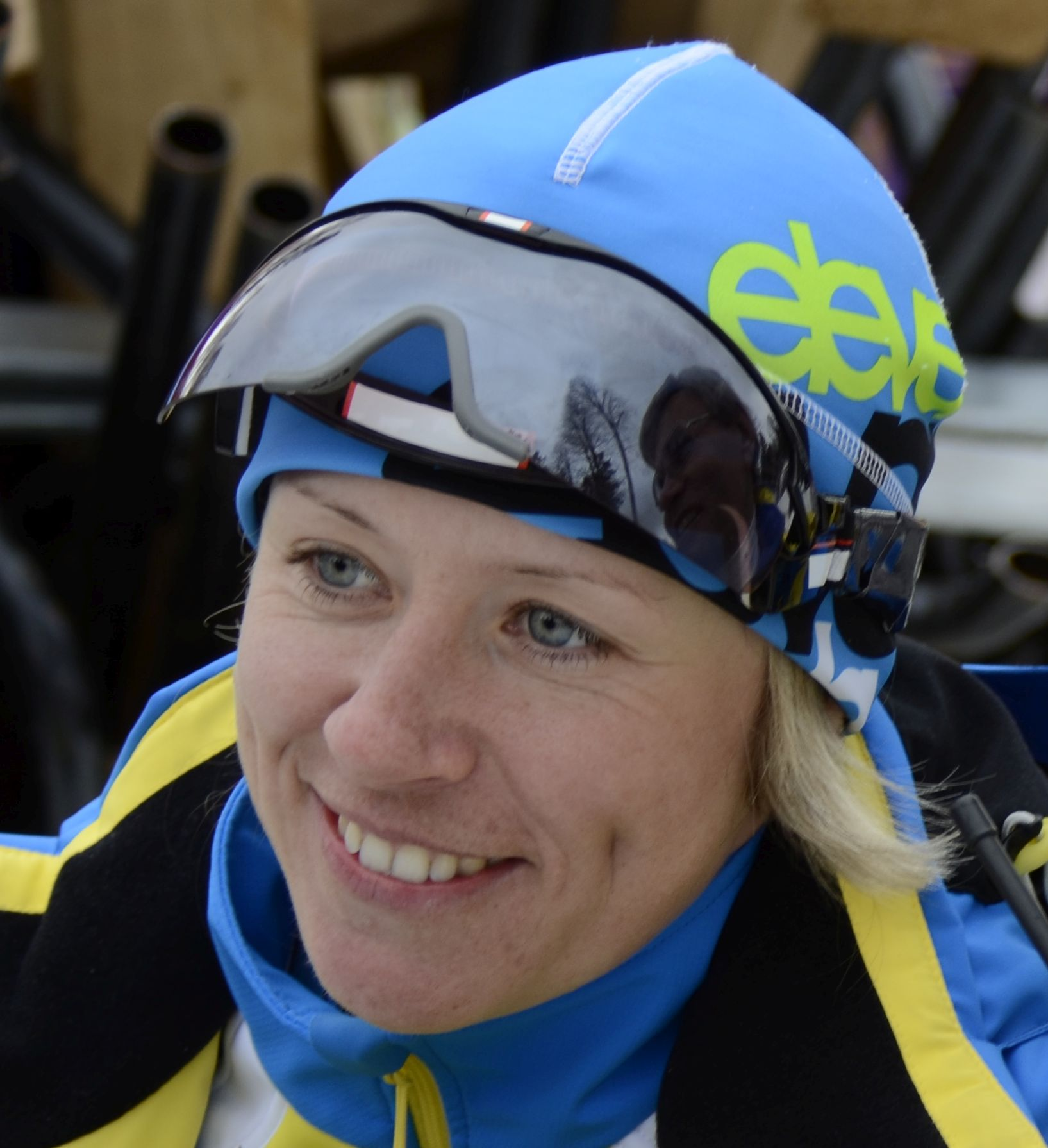
Iuliia Batenkova won a silver in the biathlon event

Men

Athlete	Event	Class	Time	DF	Misses	Final Time	Rank
Oleh Munts	Men's 7.5 km	Visually impaired	29:27.9	85	7	25:02.7	8
Vitaliy Lukyanenko	Men's 7.5 km	Visually impaired	21:56.8	100	2	21:56.8	2nd place, silver medalist(s)
Iurii Kostiuk	Men's 7.5 km	Sitting	28:22.8	91	2	25:49.5	2nd place, silver medalist(s)
Sergiy Khyzhnyak	Men's 7.5 km	Sitting	25:51.2	100	0	25:51.2	3rd place, bronze medalist(s)
Vladyslav Morozov	Men's 7.5 km	Sitting	27:35.8	100	1	28:35.8	10
Oleh Munts	Men's 12.5 km	Visually impaired	45:32.1	85	3	41:42.3	4
Vitaliy Lukyanenko	Men's 12.5 km	Visually impaired	36:54.9	100	2	38:54.9	1st place, gold medalist(s)
Iurii Kostiuk	Men's 12.5 km	Sitting	49:47.5	91	4	49:18.6	4
Oleksandr Vasyutynsky	Men's 12.5 km	Sitting	50:08.1	94	7	54:07.7	10
Sergiy Khyzhnyak	Men's 12.5 km	Sitting	46:27.3	100	8	54:27.3	12
Vladyslav Morozov	Men's 12.5 km	Sitting	45:54.9	100	4	49:54.9	6

Women

Athlete	Event	Class	Time	DF	Misses	Final Time	Rank
Tetyana Smyrnova	Women's 7.5 km	Visually impaired	27:03.8	100	2	29:03.8	4
Lyudmyla Pavlenko	Women's 7.5 km	Sitting	33:14.5	98	4	32:34.6	3rd place, bronze medalist(s)
Olena Iurkovska	Women's 7.5 km	Sitting	28:03.4	100	0	28:03.4	1st place, gold medalist(s)
Svitlana Tryfonova	Women's 7.5 km	Sitting	32:28.4	94	0	30:31.5	2nd place, silver medalist(s)
Iuliia Batenkova	Women's 7.5 km	Standing	31:07.1	96	5	29:52.4	9
Iryna Kyrychenko	Women's 7.5 km	Standing	36:45.0	84	3	30:52.2	10
Lyudmyla Pavlenko	Women's 10 km	Sitting	38:11.0	98	5	42:25.1	2nd place, silver medalist(s)
Olena Iurkovska	Women's 10 km	Sitting	35:09.1	100	6	41:09.1	1st place, gold medalist(s)
Svitlana Tryfonova	Women's 10 km	Sitting	42:05.0	94	7	46:33.5	3rd place, bronze medalist(s)
Tetyana Smyrnova	Women's 12.5 km	Visually impaired	49:30.5	100	3	52:30.5	2nd place, silver medalist(s)
Iuliia Batenkova	Women's 12.5 km	Standing	48:47.4	96	4	50:50.3	2nd place, silver medalist(s)
Iryna Kyrychenko	Women's 12.5 km	Standing	59:29.3	84	11	1:00:58.2	11

== Cross-country skiing ==
Cross-country skiing competitions were held between 12 and 19 March. Six men and six women represented Ukraine in the cross-country skiing competition. The cross-country event typically consists of skiing over a specific race distance. A disability factor is applied if people with different kinds of disability participate in a single event.

The Ukrainian team won four gold, three silver, and six bronze medals in the cross-country skiing events. Olena Iurkovska won two gold medals in the women's short and middle distance events. Iurii Kostiuk and Oleh Munts won gold in different categories in the men's long distance events.

Men

Athlete	Event	Class	Time	DF	Final Time	Rank
Vitaliy Lukyanenko	Men's short distance	Visually impaired	12:31.9	100	12:31.9	7
Iurii Kostiuk	Men's short distance	Sitting	17:12.3	91	15:39.4	2nd place, silver medalist(s)
Oleksandr Vasyutynsky	Men's short distance	Sitting	18:02.5	94	16:57.6	12
Vladyslav Morozov	Men's short distance	Sitting	16:29.6	100	16:29.6	7
Oleh Munts	Men's middle distance	Visually impaired	31:39.5	87	27:32.5	5
Iurii Kostiuk	Men's middle distance	Sitting	29:52.2	91	27:10.9	3rd place, bronze medalist(s)
Oleksandr Vasyutynsky	Men's middle distance	Sitting	30:09.7	94	28:21.1	10
Sergiy Khyzhnyak	Men's middle distance	Sitting	28:32.8	100	28:32.8	13
Vladyslav Morozov	Men's middle distance	Sitting	28:29.7	100	28:29.7	11
Oleh Munts	Men's long distance	Visually impaired	1:05:26.3	87	56:55.9	1st place, gold medalist(s)
Iurii Kostiuk	Men's long distance	Sitting	45:57.8	91	41:49.6	1st place, gold medalist(s)
Oleksandr Vasyutynsky	Men's long distance	Sitting	49:12.1	94	46:14.9	17
Sergiy Khyzhnyak	Men's long distance	Sitting	44:44.2	100	44:44.2	13
Oleh Munts; Vitaliy Lukyanenko; Vladyslav Morozov	Men's relay	Combined	—N/a		40:06.90	3rd place, bronze medalist(s)

Women

Athlete	Event	Class	Time	DF	Final Time	Rank
Tetyana Smyrnova	Women's short distance	Visually impaired	17:19.9	100	17:19.9	12
Lyudmyla Pavlenko	Women's short distance	Sitting	9:04.9	98	8:54.0	3rd place, bronze medalist(s)
Olena Iurkovska	Women's short distance	Sitting	8:27.9	100	8:27.9	1st place, gold medalist(s)
Svitlana Tryfonova	Women's short distance	Sitting	9:59.2	94	9:23.2	5
Iuliia Batenkova	Women's short distance	Standing	16:25.0	96	15:45.6	3rd place, bronze medalist(s)
Tetyana Smyrnova	Women's middle distance	Visually impaired	37:13.4	100	37:13.4	10
Lyudmyla Pavlenko	Women's middle distance	Sitting	17:49.5	98	17:28.1	4
Olena Iurkovska	Women's middle distance	Sitting	16:39.7	100	16:39.7	1st place, gold medalist(s)
Svitlana Tryfonova	Women's middle distance	Sitting	18:48.1	94	17:40.4	5
Iuliia Batenkova	Women's middle distance	Standing	37:55.7	91	34:30.8	2nd place, silver medalist(s)
Iryna Kyrychenko	Women's middle distance	Standing	43:04.9	87	37:28.8	7
Tetyana Smyrnova	Women's long distance	Visually impaired	59:38.1	100	59:38.1	11
Lyudmyla Pavlenko	Women's long distance	Sitting	33:22.2	98	32:42.2	4
Olena Iurkovska	Women's long distance	Sitting	31:50.9	100	31:50.9	2nd place, silver medalist(s)
Svitlana Tryfonova	Women's long distance	Sitting	35:33.3	94	33:25.3	6
Iuliia Batenkova	Women's long distance	Standing	1:00:48.3	91	55:20.0	3rd place, bronze medalist(s)
Iryna Kyrychenko	Women's long distance	Standing	1:06:34.0	87	57:54.8	5
Iuliia Batenkova; Lyudmyla Pavlenko; Olena Iurkovska	Women's relay	Combined	—N/a		24:54.50	3rd place, bronze medalist(s)

== See also ==
- 2006 Winter Paralympics
- Ukraine at the 2006 Winter Olympics
