= Alpine skiing at the 2006 Winter Paralympics =

Alpine skiing at the IX Paralympic Winter Games
- Venue: Sestriere
- Dates: 11 to 19 March

At the 2006 Winter Paralympics, 24 alpine skiing events were contested in Sestriere.

== Medal table ==
Rank	Nation	Gold	Silver	Bronze	Total
1	Germany (GER)	6	3	2	11
2	France (FRA)	6	2	3	11
3	United States (USA)	5	2	1	8
4	Austria (AUT)	3	4	7	14
5	Italy (ITA)	2	2	4	8
6	Japan (JPN)	1	4	1	6
7	Canada (CAN)	1	2	2	5
8	Australia (AUS)	0	1	1	2
8	Slovakia (SVK)	0	1	1	2
8	Spain (ESP)	0	1	1	2
8	Switzerland (SUI)	0	1	1	2
12	Czech Republic (CZE)	0	1	0	1
Totals (12 entries)		24	24	24	72

== Men's events ==
Event	Class	Gold		Silver		Bronze	
Downhill	visually impaired	Gerd Gradwohl; Guide: Karl-Heinz Vachenauer; Germany	1:17.22	Chris Williamson; Guide: Robert Taylor; Canada	1:17.99	Nicolas Berejny; Guide: Sophie Troc; France	1:18.39
Downhill	sitting	Kevin Bramble; United States	1:21.03	Chris Devlin-Young; United States	1:22.04	Denis Barbet; France	1:22.20
Downhill	standing	Gerd Schoenfelder; Germany	1:18.49	Michael Milton; Australia	1:19.86	Walter Lackner; Austria	1:20.19
Super-G	visually impaired	Gianmaria Dal Maistro; Guide: Tommaso Balasso; Italy	1:14.16	Radomir Dudas; Guide: Maros Hudik; Slovakia	1:14.37	Chris Williamson; Guide: Robert Taylor; Canada	1:14.53
Super-G	sitting	Martin Braxenthaler; Germany	1:12.83	Harald Eder; Austria	1:14.43	Robert Froehle; Austria	1:15.04
Super-G	standing	Walter Lackner; Austria	1:11.87	Gerd Schoenfelder; Germany	1:11.89	Toby Kane; Australia	1:12.03
Giant slalom	visually impaired	Nicolas Berejny; Guide: Sophie Troc; France	1:50.660 (57.98-52.68)	Gianmaria Dal Maistro; Guide: Tommaso Balasso; Italy	1:52.770 (58.55-54.22)	Eric Villalon; Guide: Hodei Yurrita; Spain	1:54.020 (58.84-55.18)
Giant slalom	sitting	Martin Braxenthaler; Germany	1:50.830 (58.19-52.64)	Taiki Morii; Japan	1:52.440 (58.56-53.88)	Juergen Egle; Austria	1:52.790 (59.25-53.54)
Giant slalom	standing	Gerd Schoenfelder; Germany	1:48.610 (57.12-51.49)	Masahiko Tokai; Japan	1:49.930 (59.50-50.43)	Thomas Pfyl; Switzerland	1:50.820 (1:00.16-50.66)
Slalom	visually impaired	Nicolas Berejny; Guide: Sophie Troc; France	1:26.840 (45.36-41.48)	Eric Villalon; Guide: Hodei Yurrita; Spain	1:27.160 (46.11-41.05)	Gerd Gradwohl; Guide: Karl-Heinz Vachenauer; Germany	1:27.260 (45.78-41.48)
Slalom	sitting	Martin Braxenthaler; Germany	1:23.190 (43.74-39.45)	Harald Eder; Austria	1:26.780 (45.10-41.68)	Juergen Egle; Austria	1:28.390 (47.24-41.15)
Slalom	standing	Robert Meusburger; Austria	1:22.010 (42.86-39.15)	Thomas Pfyl; Switzerland	1:22.300 (42.81-39.49)	Gerd Schoenfelder; Germany	1:22.540 (43.44-39.10)

== Women's events ==
Event	Class	Gold		Silver		Bronze	
Downhill	visually impaired	Pascale Casanova; Guide: Benedicte Sainas; France	1:28.79	Sabine Gasteiger; Guide: Emil Gasteiger; Austria	1:32.61	Silvia Parente; Guide: Lorenzo Migliari; Italy	1:34.37
Downhill	sitting	Laurie Stephens; United States	1:29.96	Kuniko Obinata; Japan	1:30.89	Claudia Loesch; Austria	1:31.30
Downhill	standing	Solène Jambaqué; France	1:28.00	Reinhild Moeller; Germany	1:30.00	Iveta Chlebakova; Slovakia	1:30.43
Super-G	visually impaired	Sabine Gasteiger; Guide: Emil Gasteiger; Austria	1:24.24	Anna Kuliskova; Guide: Martin Kulisek; Czech Republic	1:25.99	Silvia Parente; Guide: Lorenzo Migliari; Italy	1:26.79
Super-G	sitting	Laurie Stephens; United States	1:19.16	Kuniko Obinata; Japan	1:22.22	Kimberly Joines; Canada	1:23.04
Super-G	standing	Solène Jambaqué; France	1:14.13	Lauren Woolstencroft; Canada	1:16.13	Danja Haslacher; Austria	1:18.47
Giant slalom	visually impaired	Silvia Parente; Guide: Lorenzo Migliari; Italy	2:04.510 (1:03.79-1:00.72)	Pascale Casanova; Guide: Benedicte Sainas; France	2:04.780 (1:06.51-58.27)	Sabine Gasteiger; Guide: Emil Gasteiger; Austria	2:05.830 (1:05.56-1:00.27)
Giant slalom	sitting	Kuniko Obinata; Japan	2:05.030 (1:05.82-59.21)	Laurie Stephens; United States	2:05.110 (1:06.65-58.46)	Daila Dameno; Italy	2:08.080 (1:05.85-1:02.23)
Giant slalom	standing	Lauren Woolstencroft; Canada	1:57.810 (1:02.99-54.82)	Andrea Rothfuss; Germany	1:59.420 (1:04.26-55.16)	Solène Jambaqué; France	1:59.810 (1:05.40-54.41)
Slalom	visually impaired	Pascale Casanova; Guide: Benedicte Sainas; France	1:37.370 (51.22-46.15)	Sabine Gasteiger; Guide: Emil Gasteiger; Austria	1:38.390 (53.21-45.18)	Silvia Parente; Guide: Lorenzo Migliari; Italy	1:41.460 (53.41-48.05)
Slalom	sitting	Stephani Victor; United States	1:48.540 (56.58-51.96)	Daila Dameno; Italy	1:49.530 (58.19-51.34)	Tatsuko Aoki; Japan	1:51.390 (59.63-51.76)
Slalom	standing	Allison Jones; United States	1:30.140 (48.24-41.90)	Solène Jambaqué; France	1:32.610 (47.78-44.83)	Sandy Dukat; United States	1:33.660 (50.01-43.65)

== See also ==
- Alpine skiing at the 2006 Winter Olympics
