= Courtney Knight =

Canadian Paralympic athlete

Medal record

Paralympic athletics

Representing Canada

Paralympic Games
Silver medal – second place	1996 Atlanta	Discus - F12
Silver medal – second place	2000 Sydney	Pentathlon - P13
Bronze medal – third place	2004 Athens	Discus - F13

Courtney Knight is a Canadian Paralympian athlete competing mainly in category P13 discus throw events.

Knight competed in the 1996 Summer Paralympics in Atlanta, Georgia, United States. There she won a silver medal in the women's Discus throw - F12 event and finished fourth in the women's Pentathlon - P10-12 event. She also competed at the 2000 Summer Paralympics in Sydney, Australia. There she won a silver medal in the women's Pentathlon - P13 event and finished fourth in the women's Discus throw - F13 event. She also competed at the 2004 Summer Paralympics in Athens, Greece. There she won a bronze medal in the women's Discus throw - F13 event
