= Shoko Ota =

Japanese para biathlete, cross-country skier, and taekwondo practitioner

Shoko Ota (太田 渉子 (オオタ ショウコ), Oota Shōko) is a Japanese para biathlete, para cross-country skier, and para taekwondo practitioner.

== Results ==
Competing for Japan at the 2006 Winter Paralympics:

- Biathlon 7.5 km Standing - 6th
- Biathlon 12.5 km Standing - 3rd (bronze)
- Cross-country skiing 10 km Standing - 9th
- Cross-country skiing 3 × 2.5 km Relay - 5th

Competing for Japan at the 2010 Winter Paralympics:

- Biathlon: 3 km Pursuit Standing - 7th
- Biathlon: 12.5 km Individual Standing - 11th
- Cross-country skiing: 1 km Sprint Standing - 2nd (silver)
- Cross-country skiing: 5 km Standing - 11th
- Cross-country skiing: 3 x 2.5 km Relay - 5th

Competing for Japan at the 2014 Winter Paralympics:

- Biathlon: 6 km Standing - 6th place
- Biathlon: 10 km Standing - DNS
- Cross-country skiing: 1 km Sprint Standing - 8th
- Cross-country skiing: 5 km Standing - 10th
- Cross-country skiing: 4 x 2.5 km Mixed Relay - 7th

Competing for Japan at the 2020 Summer Paralympics:

- Taekwondo: +58 kg
