= Poland at the 2006 Winter Paralympics =

- IPC code: POL
- NPC: Polish Paralympic Committee
- Website: www.paralympic.org.pl

in Turin
- Competitors: 11 in 3 sports
- Medals Ranked 10th: Gold 2 Silver 0 Bronze 0 Total 2

Winter Paralympics appearances (overview)
- 1976; 1980; 1984; 1988; 1992; 1994; 1998; 2002; 2006; 2010; 2014; 2018; 2022; 2026

Poland participated in the ninth Winter Paralympics in 2006 in Turin, Italy.

Poland entered eleven athletes in the following sports:

- Alpine skiing: 4 male
- Nordic skiing: 4 male, 3 female

== Medalists ==
Medal	Name	Sport	Event	Date
Gold	Katarzyna Rogowiec	Cross-country skiing	Women's short distance, standing	12 March
Gold	Katarzyna Rogowiec	Cross-country skiing	Women's long distance, standing	19 March

== Alpine skiing ==
Athlete	Event	Final					
Athlete	Event	Run 1	Rank	Run 2	Ramk	Calculated Time	Rank
Bogdan Mirski	Slalom standing	55.10	50	50.79	40	1:45.89	40
Bogdan Mirski	Giant slalom standing	1:11.84	44	1:01.40	43	2:13.24	39
Jarosław Rola	Slalom sitting	49.88	9	44.69	13	1:34.57	10
Jarosław Rola	Giant slalom sitting	1:07.88	33	1:00.51	26	2:08.39	27
Łukasz Szeliga	Slalom standing	56.30	51	DNF		DNF	
Łukasz Szeliga	Giant slalom standing	1:17.41	57	1:06.31	45	2:23.72	49

== Biathlon ==
Athlete	Events	Final				
Athlete	Events	Time	Factor	Misses	Finish time	Rank
Wieslaw Fiedor	Sitting Pursuit	DNS				
Wieslaw Fiedor	Sitting Individual	47:11.7	100	8	55:11.7	14
Grazyna Gron	Standing Pursuit	34:34.7	97	8	33:32.4	13
Grazyna Gron	Standing Individual	52:00.2	97	15	1:05:26.6	12
Jan Kolodziej	Standing Pursuit	DNS				
Katarzyna Rogowiec	Standing Pursuit	31:37.1	87	5	27:30.4	4
Katarzyna Rogowiec	Standing Individual	51:43.2	87	9	53:59.8	6
Anna Szarota	Standing Pursuit	34:47.6	96	7	33:24.1	11
Anna Szarota	Standing Individual	54:21.4	96	4	56:10.9	8
Robert Wator	Sitting Pursuit	28:13.3	100	4	28:13.3	12

== Cross-country skiing ==
Athlete	Event	Final			
Athlete	Event	Real Time	Factor	Finish Time	Rank
Wieslaw Fiedor	Sitting Sprint Free	16:40.5	100	16:40.5	9
Wieslaw Fiedor	Sitting 10 km Classic	28:42.4	100	28:42.4	15
Wieslaw Fiedor	Sitting 15 km Classic	45:58.7	100	45:58.7	16
Grazyna Gron	Standing Sprint Free	19:11.9	97	18:37.3	13
Grazyna Gron	Standing 15 km Classic	1:06:27.0	92	1:01:08.0	9
Jan Kolodziej	Standing Sprint Free	18:10.9	80	14:32.7	23
Jan Kolodziej	Standing 10 km Classic	34:44.8	87	30:13.8	14
Jan Kolodziej	Standing 20 km Classic	1:11:10.7	87	1:01:55.5	7
Katarzyna Rogowiec	Standing Sprint Free	17:15.3	87	15:00.7	1st place, gold medalist(s)
Katarzyna Rogowiec	Standing 10 km Classic	44:12.5	79	34:55.5	4
Katarzyna Rogowiec	Standing 15 km Classic	1:06:41.3	79	52:41.0	1st place, gold medalist(s)
Kamil Rosiek	Sitting Sprint Free	18:44.9	100	18:44.9	26
Kamil Rosiek	Sitting 10 km Classic	30:55.5	100	30:55.5	25
Kamil Rosiek	Sitting 15 km Classic	48:00.7	100	48:00.7	24
Anna Szarota	Standing Sprint Free	19:07.4	96	18:21.5	12
Anna Szarota	Standing 15 km Classic	DNS			
Robert Wator	Sitting Sprint Free	16:44.7	100	16:44.7	10
Robert Wator	Sitting 10 km Classic	27:51.2	100	27:51.2	9
Robert Wator	Sitting 15 km Classic	44:43.3	100	44:43.3	12
Katarzyna Rogowiec; Anna Szarota; Grazyna Gron	3 x 2.5 km Relay	—N/a		27:23.70	6

== See also ==
- 2006 Winter Paralympics
- Poland at the 2006 Winter Olympics
