= Rustam Garifoullin =

Russian biathlete (1978–2015)

Personal information
- Born: 20 May 1978
- Died: 23 February 2015 (aged 36)

Sport
- Sport: Skiing
Medal record
Representing Russia
Paralympic Games
Men's para biathlon
Gold medal – first place	2006 Turin	7.5 km, standing
Gold medal – first place	2006 Turin	12.5 km, standing
Men's para cross-country skiing
Silver medal – second place	2006 Turin	1x3.75/2x5 km relay

Rustam Garifoullin (Russian: Рустам Гарифуллин; 20 May 1978 – 23 February 2015) was a disabled Russian cross-country skier and biathlete. He received two gold medals in Biathlon at the 2006 Winter Paralympics. He also won a silver medal in cross-country skiing in the 1x3.75/2x5 km relay at that Paralympics.

He died from a car accident on 23 February 2015.
