= Iuliia Batenkova =

Ukrainian Paralympic sportsperson

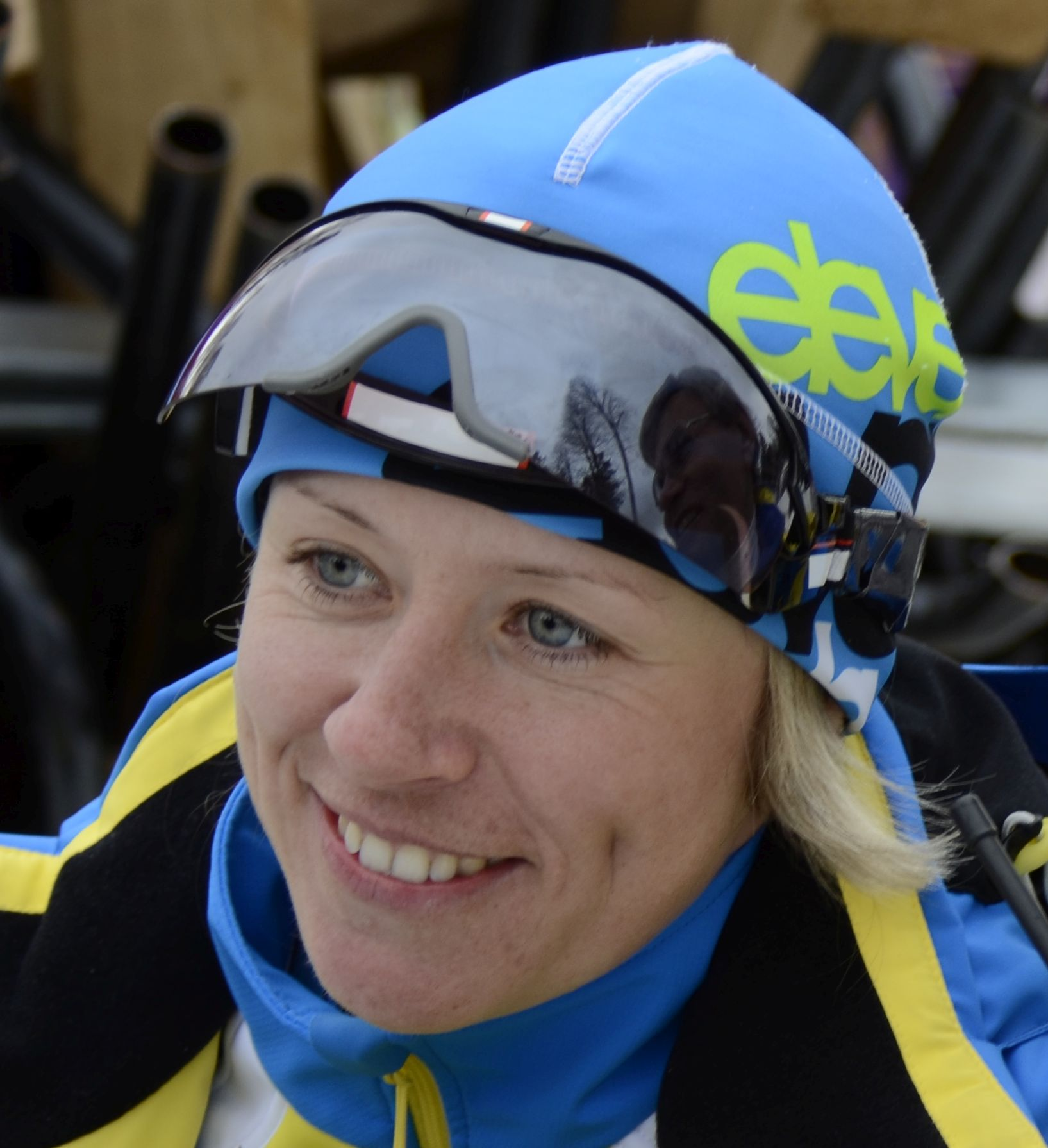
- Batenkova at Sochi 2014

Personal information
- Full name: Iuliia Batenkova-Bauman
- Nickname: Yulya
- National team: Ukraine
- Born: September 20, 1983 (age 42) Simferopol, Crimea
- Education: Open International University of Human Development "Ukraine"

Sport
- Country: Ukraine
- Sport: Cross-country skiing, biathlon
- Disability: Limb deficiency
- Disability class: LW6
- Coached by: Vladimir Gaschin
Medal record
Representing Ukraine
Paralympic Games
Women's cross-country skiing
Gold medal – first place	2018 Pyeongchang	4 x 2.5 km mixed relay
Silver medal – second place	2006 Turin	10 km classic – standing
Silver medal – second place	2010 Vancouver	3 x 2.5 km relay – standing
Silver medal – second place	2010 Vancouver	5 km classic – standing
Silver medal – second place	2010 Vancouver	15 km free – standing
Silver medal – second place	2014 Sochi	1 km sprint classic – standing
Silver medal – second place	2014 Sochi	5 km – standing
Silver medal – second place	2014 Sochi	15 km free – standing
Bronze medal – third place	2006 Turin	3 x 2.5 km relay – standing
Bronze medal – third place	2006 Turin	5 km free – standing
Bronze medal – third place	2006 Turin	12.5 km – standing
Women's biathlon
Silver medal – second place	2006 Turin	15 km classic – standing
Bronze medal – third place	2010 Vancouver	12.5 km – standing
Bronze medal – third place	2014 Sochi	6 km – standing
World Championships
Women's para cross-country skiing
Gold medal – first place	2009 Vuokatti	15 km classic – standing
Gold medal – first place	2013 Sollefteå	1 km – standing
Gold medal – first place	2013 Sollefteå	15 km free – standing
Gold medal – first place	2017 Finsterau	4 x 2.5 km mixed relay
Silver medal – second place	2005 Fort Kent	3 x 2.5 km relay – standing
Silver medal – second place	2009 Vuokatti	5 km free – standing
Silver medal – second place	2009 Vuokatti	3 x 2.5 km relay – standing
Silver medal – second place	2011 Khanty-Mansiysk	15 km classic – standing
Silver medal – second place	2013 Sollefteå	5 km classic – standing
Silver medal – second place	2017 Finsterau	15 km classic – standing
Silver medal – second place	2017 Finsterau	5 km free – standing
Silver medal – second place	2019 Prince George	5 km classic – standing
Bronze medal – third place	2009 Vuokatti	1 km sprint – standing
Bronze medal – third place	2011 Khanty-Mansiysk	5 km free – standing
Women's para biathlon
Bronze medal – third place	2021 Lillehammer	6 km - standing
- Updated on 16 November 2017

Iuliia Batenkova-Bauman (also spelled Yuliia, Yuliya, Yulia, or Julia; born 20 September 1983) is a Ukrainian Nordic skier who competes in cross-country skiing and biathlon. She has competed in three successive Winter Paralympics, where she has won 13 silver and bronze medals.

== Career ==
Batenkova was born on 20 September 1983, in Simferopol, Crimea, Ukrainian Soviet Socialist Republic. As a child, she took part in artistic gymnastics. At the age of 8, she was in a road traffic accident where her mother and brother died, and Batenkova lost her right hand. Because of the injury, she gave up gymnastics. Together with her father, she moved to Kovel, where he remarried. Batenkova graduated from school with a qualification in accounting, and during her studies she was introduced to the Foundation for Supporting Sports for the Handicapped. She took part in track and field events at first, but seeking to go to the Paralympic Games, she switched to winter sports due to heavy competition for spots in the summer events. She studied at the Open International University of Human Development "Ukraine".

Batenkova has competed at three successive Winter Paralympics, first at Turin 2006, and also in 2010 and 2014. She has won medals at each games in both Cross-country skiing and biathlon. Following the Turin Games, Batenkova was given an apartment in Lutsk by the Ukrainian Government, and has been given other financial awards for winning her medals at the three Winter Paralympics she has attended. During the 2014 Winter Paralympics closing ceremony, Batenkova was one of the Ukrainian medallists who covered their medals in protest against the annexation of Crimea by the Russian Federation. She said afterwards, "That is how we show our protest and disagreement that our country could be divided and part of it could be excluded from Ukraine, Crimea is my motherland, where I was born, and of course I worry about it. I want peace."

She won the bronze medal in the women's 6 km standing biathlon event at the 2021 World Para Snow Sports Championships held in Lillehammer, Norway.
