= Canada at the 2006 Winter Paralympics =

- Flag of Canada
- IPC code: CAN
- NPC: Canadian Paralympic Committee
- Website: www.paralympic.ca

in Turin
- Competitors: 35 in 4 sports
- Flag bearers: Todd Nicholson (opening); Colette Bourgonje (closing)
- Medals Ranked 6th: Gold 5 Silver 3 Bronze 5 Total 13

Winter Paralympics appearances (overview)
- 1976; 1980; 1984; 1988; 1992; 1994; 1998; 2002; 2006; 2010; 2014; 2018; 2022; 2026

Canada participated in the ninth Winter Paralympics in Turin, Italy. Heading the delegation was the Chef de Mission, Marg McGregor. The country's flag bearer at the opening ceremony was Todd Nicholson, captain of the ice sledge hockey team.

Canada entered 35 athletes in the following sports:

- Alpine skiing: 7 male, 3 female
- Ice sledge hockey: 15 male
- Nordic skiing: 3 male, 2 female
- Wheelchair curling: 3 male, 2 female

== Medallists ==
Medal	Name	Sport	Event	Date
Gold	Brian McKeever; Guide: Robin McKeever	Cross-country skiing	Men's 5 km, visually impaired	March 12
Gold	Brian McKeever; Guide: Robin McKeever	Cross-country skiing	Men's 10 km, visually impaired	March 15
Gold	Lauren Woolstencroft	Alpine skiing	Women's giant slalom, standing	March 16
Gold	Canada national ice sledge hockey team: Jeremy Booker; Bradley Bowden; Billy Bridges; Marc Dorion; Raymond Grassi; Jean Labonte; Herve Lord; Shawn Matheson; Graeme Murray; Todd Nicholson; Mark Noot; Paul Rosen; Benoit St-Amand; Dany Verner; Greg Westlake	Ice sledge hockey	Ice sledge hockey	March 18
Gold	Chris Daw; Gerry Austgarden; Gary Cormack; Sonja Gaudet; Karen Blachford	Wheelchair curling	Wheelchair curling	March 18
Silver	Chris Williamson; Guide: Robert Taylor	Alpine skiing	Men's downhill, visually impaired	March 12
Silver	Lauren Woolstencroft	Alpine skiing	Women's super-G, standing	March 13
Silver	Brian McKeever; Guide: Robin McKeever	Cross-country skiing	Men's 20 km, visually impaired	March 19
Bronze	Kimberly Joines	Alpine skiing	Women's super-G, sitting	March 14
Bronze	Brian McKeever; Guide: Robin McKeever	Biathlon	Men's 7.5 km, visually impaired	March 14
Bronze	Chris Williamson; Guide: Robert Taylor	Alpine skiing	Men's super-G, visually impaired	March 14
Bronze	Colette Bourgonje	Cross-country skiing	Women's 5 km, sitting	March 15
Bronze	Colette Bourgonje	Cross-country skiing	Women's 10 km, sitting	March 18

== See also ==
- 2006 Winter Paralympics
- Canada at the 2006 Winter Olympics
