= Germany at the 2006 Winter Paralympics =

- IPC code: GER
- NPC: National Paralympic Committee Germany
- Website: www.dbs-npc.de (in German)

in Turin
- Competitors: 35 in 3 sports
- Medals Ranked 2nd: Gold 8 Silver 5 Bronze 5 Total 18

Winter Paralympics appearances (overview)
- 1976; 1980; 1984; 1988; 1992; 1994; 1998; 2002; 2006; 2010; 2014; 2018; 2022; 2026

Germany participated in the ninth Winter Paralympics in Turin, Italy.

Germany entered 35 athletes in the following sports:

- Alpine skiing: 8 male, 4 female
- Ice sledge hockey: 14 male
- Nordic skiing: 8 male, 1 female

== Medalists ==
Medal	Name	Sport	Event	Date
Gold	Gerd Schönfelder	Alpine skiing	Men's downhill, standing	11 March
Gold	Verena Bentele	Cross-country skiing	Women's short distance, visually impaired	12 March
Gold	Gerd Gradwohl	Alpine skiing	Men's downhill, visually impaired	12 March
Gold	Verena Bentele	Biathlon	Women's 7.5 km, visually impaired	14 March
Gold	Martin Braxenthaler	Alpine skiing	Men's super-G, sitting	14 March
Gold	Gerd Schönfelder	Alpine skiing	Men's giant slalom, standing	16 March
Gold	Martin Braxenthaler	Alpine skiing	Men's giant slalom, sitting	17 March
Gold	Martin Braxenthaler	Alpine skiing	Men's slalom, sitting	19 March
Silver	Reinhild Möller	Alpine skiing	Women's downhill, standing	11 March
Silver	Frank Höfle	Cross-country skiing	Men's short distance, visually impaired	12 March
Silver	Gerd Schönfelder	Alpine skiing	Men's super-G, standing	13 March
Silver	Josef Giesen	Biathlon	Men's 7.5 km, standing	14 March
Silver	Andrea Rothfuss	Alpine skiing	Women's giant slalom, standing	16 March
Bronze	Wilhelm Brem	Biathlon	Men's 12.5 km, visually impaired	11 March
Bronze	Verena Bentele	Biathlon	Women's 12.5 km, visually impaired	11 March
Bronze	Thomas Oelsner	Cross-country skiing	Men's short distance, standing	12 March
Bronze	Gerd Schönfelder	Alpine skiing	Men's slalom, standing	18 March
Bronze	Gerd Gradwohl	Alpine skiing	Men's slalom, visually impaired	19 March

== See also ==
- 2006 Winter Paralympics
- Germany at the 2006 Winter Olympics
