= Larysa Varona =

Belarusian Para cross-country skier, biathlete, and rower (born 1983)

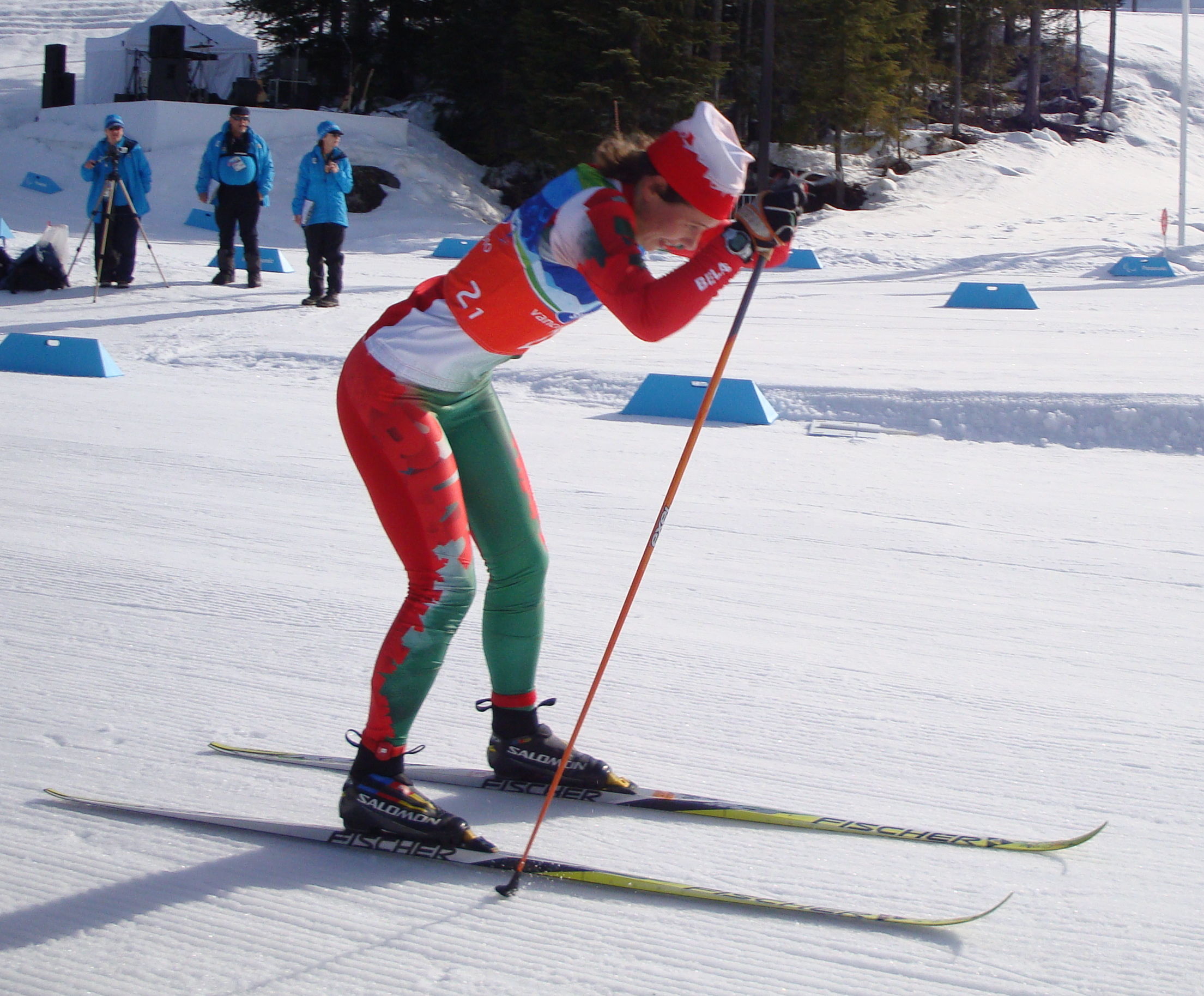
- Varona competing in the 2010 Winter Paralympics

Personal information
- Nationality: Belarusian
- Born: 22 January 1983 (age 43) Krupki, Soviet Union

Sport
- Country: Belarus
- Sport: Para Nordic skiing (Para cross-country skiing and Para biathlon), Para rowing
- Disability class: LW6/8
Medal record
Women's Para cross-country skiing
Representing Belarus
Winter Paralympics
Silver medal – second place	Turin 2006	3 × 2.5 km relay open
Bronze medal – third place	Vancouver 2010	3 x 2.5 km relay open
Bronze medal – third place	Vancouver 2010	5km classic standing

Larysa Varona (born 22 January 1983), also known as Larisa Varona, is a Belarusian Para cross-country skier, biathlete, and rower. She has represented Belarus at the Paralympics in 4 Winter Paralympics competing in cross-country skiing and biathlon events (2006, 2010, 2014 and 2018) and in a single Summer Paralympics event during the 2012 Summer Paralympics competing in the rowing event.

== Biography ==
Larysa Varona was born with a locomotor impairment on 22 January 1983. She started skiing at the age of eleven.

== Career ==
She made her Paralympic debut for Belarus at the 2006 Winter Paralympics at the age of 23 and managed to claim a silver medal in her first Paralympic event in the women's cross-country skiing 3 × 2.5 km relay open category becoming the youngest medalist for Belarus at the Winter Paralympics (at the age of 23). Varona also competed at the 2010 Winter Paralympics clinching 2 bronze medals in the women's cross-country skiing 3 x 2.5 km relay open and women's cross-country skiing 5km classic events. She also participated in the 2014 Winter Paralympics but did not achieve any medals in the competition.

Varona also took part in international rowing competitions and got the opportunity to represent Belarus at the 2012 Summer Paralympics and competed in the mixed coxed four event.
