= Rudolf Weber (handballer) =

Swiss handball player

Personal information
- Nationality: Swiss
- Born: 8 April 1957 (age 67)

Sport
- Sport: Handball

Rudolf Weber (born 8 April 1957) is a Swiss handball player. He competed in the men's tournament at the 1980 Summer Olympics.
