= Norway at the 2006 Winter Paralympics =

- IPC code: NOR
- NPC: Norwegian Olympic and Paralympic Committee and Confederation of Sports
- Website: www.idrett.no (in Norwegian)

in Turin
- Competitors: 29 in 4 sports
- Medals Ranked 12th: Gold 1 Silver 1 Bronze 3 Total 5

Winter Paralympics appearances (overview)
- 1976; 1980; 1984; 1988; 1992; 1994; 1998; 2002; 2006; 2010; 2014; 2018; 2022; 2026

Norway participated in the ninth Winter Paralympics in Turin, Italy.

Norway entered 29 athletes in the following sports:

- Alpine skiing: 2 male
- Ice sledge hockey: 14 male
- Nordic skiing: 7 male, 1 female
- Wheelchair curling: 4 male, 1 female

== Medalists ==
| Medal | Name | Sport | Event | Date |
|---|---|---|---|---|
| Gold | Kjartan Haugen; Karl Einar Henriksen; Andreas Hustveit | Cross-country skiing | Men's 1 × 3.75 km + 2 × 5 km relay | 11 March |
| Silver | Norway men's national ice sledge hockey team | Ice sledge hockey | Mixed team | 18 March |
| Bronze | Nils-Erik Ulset | Biathlon | Men's 12.5 km, standing | 11 March |
| Bronze | Helge Flo | Cross-country skiing | Men's short distance, visually impaired | 12 March |
| Bronze | Nils-Erik Ulset | Biathlon | Men's 7.5 km, standing | 14 March |

== See also ==
- 2006 Winter Paralympics
- Norway at the 2006 Winter Olympics
