= Kjartan Haugen =

Norwegian Para cross-country skier (born 1975)

Personal information
- Full name: Kjartan Nesbakken Haugen
- Born: 6 March 1975 (age 51) Trondheim, Norway
- Height: 1.90 m (6 ft 3 in)

Sport
- Country: Norway
- Sport: Para cross-country skiing
- Disability class: LW4
Medal record
Men's Para cross-country skiing
Representing Norway
Paralympic Games
Gold medal – first place	2002 Salt Lake	5 km classic style LW2-4
Gold medal – first place	2006 Torino	1x3.75/2x5 km relay
Silver medal – second place	1998 Nagano	5 km classical LW3/4/9
Bronze medal – third place	1998 Nagano	4×5 km relay
Bronze medal – third place	2002 Salt Lake	1x2.5/2x5 km relay
Bronze medal – third place	2022 Beijing	4 × 2.5 km relay open
Bronze medal – third place	2026 Milano Cortina	4 × 2.5 km relay open

Kjartan Nesbakken Haugen (born 6 March 1975 in Trondheim) is a disabled Norwegian Para cross-country skier. He won a gold medal at the 2002 Winter Paralympics for 5 km and another gold at the 2006 Winter Paralympics as part of the Norwegian relay team. He also won a bronze in 2002 and a bronze and a silver at the 1998 Games. He is a Right to Play ambassador. Haugen participated at the 2022 Winter Paralympics.
