= Tatiana Ilyuchenko =

Russian Para biathlete and cross-country skier (born 1973)

Personal information
- Born: 19 December 1973 (age 52) Barnaul, Altaiski krai, Russia

Sport
- Country: Russia
- Sport: Para Nordic skiing (Para cross-country skiing and Para biathlon)
Medal record
Women's Para cross-country skiing
Representing Russia
Paralympic Games
Gold medal – first place	2010 Vancouver	3 x 2.5 km relay open
Bronze medal – third place	2010 Vancouver	5km classic style

Tatiana Ilyuchenko (born 19 December 1973) is a Russian female visually impaired Para cross-country skier and biathlete. She won a bronze medal at the 2010 Winter Paralympics

== Career ==
She participated at five Paralympic Games, including the 2006 Winter Paralympics, and the 2010 Winter Paralympics. She participated at the 2009 Paralympic Winter World Cup
