= Sergey Shilov =

Russian paralympic competitor

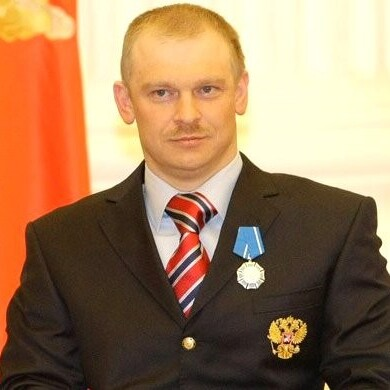

Personal information
- Full name: Sergey Valentinovich Shilov
- Born: 1 October 1970 (age 55) Pskov, RSFSR, Soviet Union

Sport
- Sport: Skiing
Medal record
Men's para cross-country skiing
Representing Russia
Paralympic Games
Gold medal – first place	2010 Vancouver	1 km sprint, sitting
Gold medal – first place	2010 Vancouver	1x4/2x5 km relay
Silver medal – second place	2006 Torino	10 km, sitting
Silver medal – second place	2006 Torino	1x3.75/2x5 km relay
Bronze medal – third place	2006 Torino	15 km, sitting
Gold medal – first place	2002 Salt Lake	15 km, sitski
Gold medal – first place	2002 Salt Lake	5 km, sitski
Gold medal – first place	2002 Salt Lake	1x2.5/2x5 km relay
Silver medal – second place	2002 Salt Lake	10 km, sitski
Gold medal – first place	1998 Nagano	5 km, sitski

Sergey Valentinovich Shilov (Russian: Сергей Валентинович Шилов; born 1 October 1970) is a Russian cross-country skier, biathlete, and six-time Paralympic Champion.

Shilov has competed at nine Paralympic Games (five Winter and four Summer), in cross-country skiing, biathlon, and athletics. He has won a total of 10 medals at the Games, in cross-country skiing, of which six are gold.
