= Verena Bentele =

German paralympic biathlete and politician

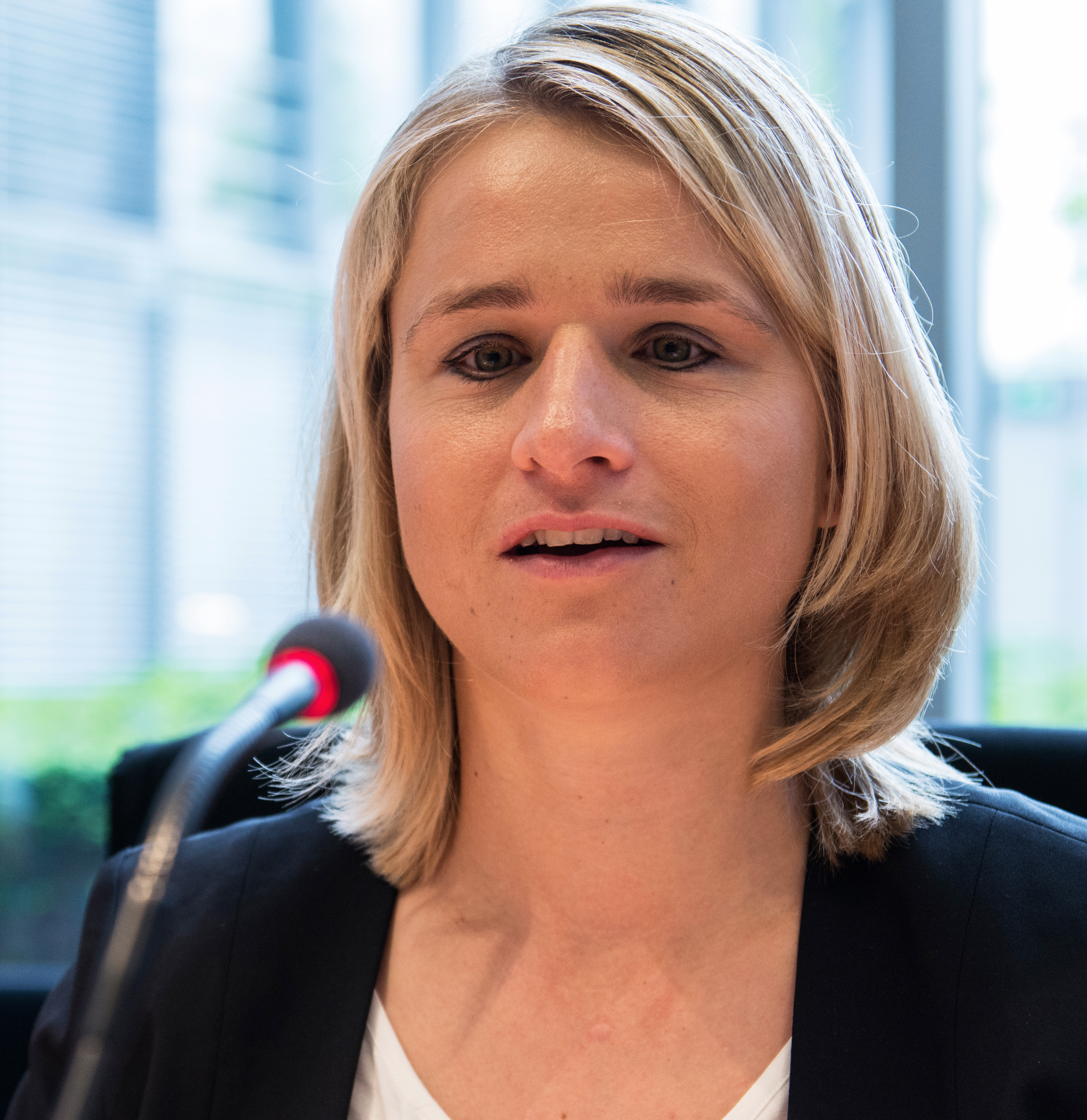
- Bentele in 2013

Personal information
- Nationality: German
- Born: 28 February 1982 (age 44) Lindau, Bavaria, West Germany

Sport
- Country: Germany
- Sport: Biathlon, Cross-country skiing
- Coached by: Werner Nauber
- Retired: 2011
Medal record
Representing Germany
Paralympic Games
Women's biathlon
Gold medal – first place	1998 Nagano	7.5km free technique B1
Gold medal – first place	2002 Salt Lake City	7.5km free technique blind
Gold medal – first place	2006 Turin	7.5km blind
Gold medal – first place	2010 Vancouver	12.5km Individual visually impaired
Gold medal – first place	2010 Vancouver	3km Pursuit visually impaired
Bronze medal – third place	2006 Turin	12.5km blind
Women's cross-country skiing
Gold medal – first place	2002 Salt Lake City	10km free technique B1-2
Gold medal – first place	2002 Salt Lake City	15km free technique visually impaired
Gold medal – first place	2002 Salt Lake City	5km classical technique B1
Gold medal – first place	2006 Turin	5km blind visually impaired
Gold medal – first place	2010 Vancouver	1km Sprint visually impaired
Gold medal – first place	2010 Vancouver	15km visually impaired
Gold medal – first place	2010 Vancouver	5km visually impaired
Silver medal – second place	1998 Nagano	5km classical technique B1
Silver medal – second place	1998 Nagano	5km free technique B1
Bronze medal – third place	1998 Nagano	3x2km relay open

Verena Bentele (born 28 February 1982, in Lindau) is a blind German Paralympic biathlete and cross-country skier. She studied at the Carl-Strehl Schule, a special school for the blind and partially sighted in Marburg, Germany. She won her first Paralympic medals (one gold, two silver, one bronze) at the 1998 Winter Paralympics, followed by four gold medals at the 2002 Winter Paralympics, as well as two gold and one bronze medal at the 2006 Winter Paralympics. She was also winner of the Combined World Cup in Biathlon und Cross-Country in 2006.

== Career ==
During the 2009 German blind cross country championship, Bentele had a serious accident. Her sighted guide failed to give proper directions, so she fell down a slope in a dry river bed. She tore a cruciate ligament in her knee, and suffered finger and liver injuries, and damaged one kidney so badly that it had to be removed.

Despite this, only a year later, Bentele had her best Olympic result, winning five gold medals in the 2010 Winter Paralympics in Vancouver. As a result of her performance at the Games, Bentele was named Best Female at the Paralympic Sport Awards.

Bentele has won the "Laureus World Sportsperson of the Year with a Disability" award for the year 2011. Late in 2011, she announced her retirement at the age of 29. In 2014 Bentele was inducted into the Paralympic Hall of Fame.

Bentele was nominated by the Social Democratic Party to be a delegate to the Federal Convention for the purpose of electing the President of Germany in 2010, 2012 and 2017. She joined the party in 2012.

== Federal Government Commissioner for Matters relating to Disabled Persons, 2014–2018 ==
In January 2014, Bentele was appointed Federal Government Commissioner for Matters relating to Disabled Persons in the government of Chancellor Angela Merkel. In this capacity, she was part of the Federal Ministry of Labour and Social Affairs under the leadership of minister Andrea Nahles and heads the government's focal point in charge of monitoring the implementation of the Convention on the Rights of Persons with Disabilities. She served in that position until 2018.

== Sozialverband VdK Deutschland e.V., from 2018 ==
In May 2018, Bentele was elected president of the non-profit organisation Sozialverband VdK Deutschland e.V., the largest social association in Germany.

== Other activities ==
- German Sport University Cologne (DSHS), Member of the University Council
- German Institute for Human Rights (DIMR), Ex-Officio Member of the Board of Trustees
- National Paralympic Committee Germany (DBS), Member of the Board of Trustees (since 2012)

Awards and achievements
Preceded by (South Africa) Natalie du Toit	Laureus World Sportsperson with a Disability of the Year; 2011	Succeeded by (South Africa) Oscar Pistorius
