= Irina Polyakova =

Personal information
- Nationality: Russian
- Born: 9 March 1961 (age 65) Kazan, Soviet Union
- Years active: 1998-2011

Sport
- Country: Russia
- Sport: Paralympic Nordic skiing (Paralympic biathlon and Paralympic cross-country skiing)
- Disability class: LW12
- Coached by: Farida Safiullina
Medal record
Representing Russia
Women's Paralympic cross-country skiing
Winter Paralympics
| Gold medal – first place | Turin 2006 | 3 × 2.5 km relay open |
| Silver medal – second place | Salt Lake City 2002 | 3 × 2.5 km relay open |

Irina Polyakova (born 9 March 1961) is a former Russian female Paralympic cross-country skier and biathlete. She has competed at the Winter Paralympics in 1998, 2002, 2006 and in 2010 representing Russia. She was named as one of the most popular women by the BBC in its special multi format series, the 100 Women in 2015.

== Career ==
Irina Polyakova took the sport of skiing and biathlon only at the age of 35 which is quite late in her career and got the opportunity to represent Russia at the 1998 Winter Paralympics at the age of 37. She wasn't successful in her maiden Paralympic event as she went medalless before claiming her first Paralympic medal, a silver medal in the women's cross-country skiing relay team event at the 2002 Winter Paralympics. Irina also was part of the Russian relay team which claimed gold medal in the women's relay open event in the 2006 Winter Paralympics.

== Coaching career ==
After retiring from international skiing in 2011, she started her coaching career.
