= Russia at the 2006 Winter Paralympics =

- IPC code: RUS
- NPC: Russian Paralympic Committee
- Website: www.paralymp.ru (in Russian)

in Turin
- Competitors: 29 in 2 sports
- Medals Ranked 1st: Gold 13 Silver 13 Bronze 7 Total 33

Winter Paralympics appearances (overview)
- 1994; 1998; 2002; 2006; 2010; 2014; 2018–2022; 2026

Other related appearances
- Soviet Union (1988); Unified Team (1992); Neutral Paralympic Athletes (2018)

Russia participated in the ninth Winter Paralympics in Turin, Italy.

Russia entered 29 athletes in the following sports:

- Alpine skiing: 3 male, 3 female
- Nordic skiing: 15 male, 8 female

== Medalists ==
Name	Sport	Event	Medal
Alena Gorbunova	Biathlon	Women's 7.5 km, standing	Gold
Alfis Makamedinov	Biathlon	Men's 12.5 km, standing	Silver
Alfis Makamedinov	Cross-country skiing	Men's 10 km, standing	Silver
Alfis Makamedinov	Cross-country skiing	Men's 15 km, standing	Silver
Anna Burmistrova	Biathlon	Women's 7.5 km, standing	Silver
Anna Burmistrova	Cross-country skiing	Women's 5 km, standing	Silver
Anna Burmistrova	Cross-country skiing	Women's 10 km, standing	Gold
Anna Burmistrova	Cross-country skiing	Women's 15 km, standing	Silver
Elvira Ibraginova	Biathlon	Women's 7.5 km, visually impaired	Silver
Irek Mannanov; Guide: Rostislav Pavlov	Biathlon	Men's 12.5 km, visually impaired	Silver
Irek Mannanov; Guide: Rostislav Pavlov	Biathlon	Men's 7.5 km, visually impaired	Gold
Irek Mannanov; Guide: Rostislav Pavlov	Cross-country skiing	Men's relay, 1x3.75 km + 2x5km	Silver
Irina Polyakova	Cross-country skiing	Women's relay, 3x2.5 km	Gold
Kirill Mikhaylov	Cross-country skiing	Men's 10 km, standing	Bronze
Kirill Mikhaylov	Cross-country skiing	Men's 15 km, standing	Gold
Lioubov Vasilieva; Guide: Viateslav Goldinov	Cross-country skiing	Women's 5 km, visually impaired	Bronze
Lioubov Vasilieva; Guide: Viateslav Goldinov	Cross-country skiing	Women's 10 km, visually impaired	Gold
Lioubov Vasilieva; Guide: Viateslav Goldinov	Cross-country skiing	Women's 15 km, visually impaired	Gold
Lioubov Vasilieva; Guide: Viateslav Goldinov	Cross-country skiing	Women's relay, 3x2.5 km	Gold
Mikhail Terentiev	Biathlon	Men's 12.5 km, sitting	Bronze
Rustam Garifoullin	Biathlon	Men's 12.5 km, standing	Gold
Rustam Garifoullin	Biathlon	Men's 7.5 km, standing	Gold
Rustam Garifoullin	Cross-country skiing	Men's relay, 1x3.75 km + 2x5km	Silver
Sergej Shilov	Cross-country skiing	Men's 10 km, sitting	Silver
Sergej Shilov	Cross-country skiing	Men's 15 km, sitting	Bronze
Sergej Shilov	Cross-country skiing	Men's relay, 1x3.75 km + 2x5km	Silver
Taras Kryjanovski	Biathlon	Men's 12.5 km, sitting	Silver
Taras Kryjanovski	Cross-country skiing	Men's 5 km, sitting	Gold
Taras Kryjanovski	Cross-country skiing	Men's 10 km, sitting	Gold
Taras Kryjanovski	Cross-country skiing	Men's 15 km, sitting	Silver
Tatiana Ilyuchenko; Guide: Valeriy Koshkin	Cross-country skiing	Women's 5 km, visually impaired	Silver
Tatiana Ilyuchenko; Guide: Valeriy Koshkin	Cross-country skiing	Women's 10 km, visually impaired	Silver
Tatiana Ilyuchenko; Guide: Valeriy Koshkin	Cross-country skiing	Women's 15 km, visually impaired	Bronze
Tatiana Ilyuchenko; Guide: Valeriy Koshkin	Cross-country skiing	Women's relay, 3x2.5 km	Gold
Valery Koupchinsky; Guide: Viatcheslav Doubov	Cross-country skiing	Men's 10 km, visually impaired	Bronze
Vladimir Kiselev	Biathlon	Men's 12.5 km, sitting	Gold
Vladimir Kiselev	Biathlon	Men's 7.5 km, sitting	Gold

== See also ==
- 2006 Winter Paralympics
- Russia at the 2006 Winter Olympics
