= Japan at the 2006 Winter Paralympics =

- IPC code: JPN
- NPC: Japan Paralympic Committee
- Website: www.jsad.or.jp (in Japanese)

in Turin
- Competitors: 40 in 3 sports
- Medals Ranked 8th: Gold 2 Silver 5 Bronze 2 Total 9

Winter Paralympics appearances (overview)
- 1976; 1980; 1984; 1988; 1992; 1994; 1998; 2002; 2006; 2010; 2014; 2018; 2022; 2026

Japan participated in the ninth Winter Paralympics in Turin, Italy.

Japan entered 40 athletes in the following sports:

- Alpine skiing: 13 male, 4 female
- Ice sledge hockey: 15 male
- Nordic skiing: 5 male, 3 female

== Medalists ==
Medal	Name	Sport	Event	Date
Gold	Miyuki Kobayashi	Biathlon	Women's 12.5 km, visually impaired	11 March
Gold	Kuniko Obinata	Alpine skiing	Women's giant slalom, sitting	17 March
Silver	Kuniko Obinata	Alpine skiing	Women's downhill, sitting	12 March
Silver	Miyuki Kobayashi	Biathlon	Women's 7.5 km, visually impaired	14 March
Silver	Kuniko Obinata	Alpine skiing	Women's super-G, sitting	14 March
Silver	Masahiko Tokai	Alpine skiing	Men's giant slalom, standing	16 March
Silver	Taiki Morii	Alpine skiing	Men's giant slalom, sitting	17 March
Bronze	Shoko Ota	Biathlon	Women's 12.5 km, standing	11 March
Bronze	Tatsuko Aoki	Alpine skiing	Women's slalom, sitting	19 March

== See also ==
- 2006 Winter Paralympics
- Japan at the 2006 Winter Olympics
