= France at the 2006 Winter Paralympics =

- IPC code: FRA
- NPC: French Paralympic and Sports Committee
- Website: france-paralympique.fr

in Turin
- Competitors: 19 in 2 sports
- Medals Ranked 4th: Gold 7 Silver 2 Bronze 6 Total 15

Winter Paralympics appearances (overview)
- 1976; 1980; 1984; 1988; 1992; 1994; 1998; 2002; 2006; 2010; 2014; 2018; 2022; 2026

France participated in the ninth Winter Paralympics in Turin, Italy.

France entered 19 athletes in the following sports:

- Alpine skiing: 8 male, 2 female
- Nordic skiing: 6 male, 3 female

== Medalists ==
	(gold)	(silver)	(bronze)	Total
France	7	2	6	15

== See also ==
- 2006 Winter Paralympics
- France at the 2006 Winter Olympics
