= 2011 IPC Biathlon and Cross-Country Skiing World Championships – Men's 10 kilometre freestyle =

The Men's 10 km freestyle events in cross-country skiing, were held on April 3, 2011, as part of the 2011 IPC Biathlon and Cross-Country Skiing World Championships.

== Medals ==
Class	Gold	Silver	Bronze
Sitting	Irek Zaripov; Russia	Enzo Masiello; Italy	Trygve Steinar Larsen; Norway
Standing	Vladimir Kononov; Russia	Kirill Mikhaylov; Russia	Azat Karachurin; Russia
Visually impaired	Brian McKeever; Guide: Erik Carleton; Canada	Nikolay Polukhin; Guide: Andrey Tokarev; Russia	Vasili Shaptsiaboi; Guide: Mikalai Shablouski; Belarus

== Results ==
=== Sitting ===
Rank	Bib	Athlete	Country	Real time	Deficit	Class	%	Time (calculated)
1st place, gold medalist(s)	107	Irek Zaripov	Russia	23:31.0	0.0	LW12	100	24:31.0
2nd place, silver medalist(s)	100	Enzo Masiello	Italy	26:17.5	+12.6	LW11	94	24:42.9
3rd place, bronze medalist(s)	105	Trygve Steinar Larsen	Norway	24:50.9	+19.9	LW12	100	24:50.9
4	113	Chris Klebl	Canada	26:33.1	+28.2	LW11	94	24:57.5
5	108	Kamil Rosiek	Poland	25:10.0	+39.0	LW12	100	25:10.0
6	106	Sergey Shilov	Russia	29:51.2	+1:20.7	LW10	86	25:40.4
7	112	Aliaksandr Davidovich	Belarus	25:45.2	+1:14.2	LW12	100	25:45.2
8	93	Igor Kuznetsov	Russia	26:31.2	+1:30.2	LW11.5	98	25:59.4
9	111	Robert Wator	Poland	25:59.6	+1:28.6	LW12	100	25:59.6
10	95	Romain Rosique	France	27:47.4	+1:42.5	LW11	94	26:07.4
11	94	Dzmitry Loban	Belarus	26:09.0	+1:38.0	LW12	100	26:09.0
12	109	Roman Petushkov	Russia	26:14.0	+1:43.0	LW12	100	26:14.0
13	102	Sergiy Khyzhnyak	Ukraine	26:20.2	+1:49.2	LW12	100	26:20.2
14	104	Sean Halsted	United States	26:53.9	+1:52.9	LW11.5	98	26:21.6
15	99	Iurii Kostiuk	Ukraine	29:26.4	+2:29.9	LW10.5	91	26:47.4
16	91	Yauheni Lukyanenka	Belarus	27:05.7	+2:34.7	LW12	100	27:05.7
17	92	Mykhaylo Tkachenko	Ukraine	27:14.0	+2:43.0	LW12	100	27:14.0
18	97	Barys Pronka	Belarus	29:07.8	+3:02.9	LW11	94	27:22.9
19	101	Alexey Bychenok	Russia	27:30.8	+2:59.8	LW12	100	27:30.8
20	98	Martin Fleig	Germany	28:16.3	+3:15.3	LW11.5	98	27:42.4
21	103	Thierry Raoux	France	34:10.0	+5:39.5	LW10	86	29:23.0
22	96	Daniel Cnossen	United States	30:23.2	+5:52.2	LW12	100	30:23.2
		Nikolay Khlupenkov	Russia	DNS		LW12	100	

=== Standing ===
Rank	Bib	Athlete	Country	Real time	Deficit	Class	%	Time (calculated)
1st place, gold medalist(s)	20	Vladimir Kononov	Russia	28:50.6	0.0	LW5/7	87	25:05.6
2nd place, silver medalist(s)	16	Kirill Mikhaylov	Russia	26:37.8	+29.5	LW4	96	25:33.9
3rd place, bronze medalist(s)	15	Azat Karachurin	Russia	29:32.3	+41.7	LW5/7	87	25:41.9
4	10	Rushan Minnegulov	Russia	26:55.6	+1:03.4	LW8	97	26:07.1
5	17	Ilkka Tuomisto	Finland	27:00.8	+1:08.6	LW8	97	26:12.2
6	6	Nils-Erik Ulset	Norway	29:26.6	+1:14.9	LW3	89	26:12.3
7	7	Michael Kurz	Austria	28:53.2	+1:36.7	LW9	92	26:34.5
8	8	Yannick Bourseaux	France	28:02.3	+1:54.0	LW6	96	26:55.0
9	9	Vegard Dahle	Norway	28:23.6	+2:15.3	LW4	96	27:15.5
10	13	Siarhei Silchanka	Belarus	28:07.6	+2:15.4	LW8	97	27:17.0
11	11	Grygorii Vovchynskyi	Ukraine	28:11.5	+2:19.3	LW8	97	27:20.8
12	12	Oleh Leshchyshyn	Ukraine	28:44.5	+2:52.3	LW8	97	27:52.8
13	18	Svein Lilleberg	Norway	32:28.5	+3:17.8	LW2	86	27:55.7
14	1	Vladislav Lekomtcev	Russia	29:48.0	+3:39.7	LW6	96	28:36.5
15	4	Vitalii Sytnyk	Ukraine	29:50.1	+3:41.8	LW6	96	28:38.5
16	3	Aleksandr Iaremchuk	Russia	31:20.4	+5:12.1	LW6	96	30:05.2
17	5	Ivan Kodlozerov	Russia	31:12.3	+5:20.1	LW8	97	30:16.1
18	19	Dmitry Shevchenko	Russia	31:51.4	+5:59.2	LW8	97	30:54.1
19	2	Daniel Hathorn	United States	32:42.7	+6:50.5	LW8	97	31:43.8
	14	Sergey Lapkin	Russia	DNF		LW4	96	

=== Visually impaired ===
Rank	Bib	Athlete	Country	Real time	Deficit	Class	%	Time (calculated)
1st place, gold medalist(s)	36	Brian McKeever; Guide: Erik Carleton	Canada	24:28.5	0.0	B3	100	24:28.5
2nd place, silver medalist(s)	44	Nikolay Polukhin; Guide: Andrey Tokarev	Russia	25:45.2	+46.7	B2	98	25:14.3
3rd place, bronze medalist(s)	45	Vasili Shaptsiaboi; Guide: Mikalai Shablouski	Belarus	26:20.1	+1:21.6	B2	98	25:48.5
4	43	Wilhelm Brem; Guide: Florian Grimm	Germany	30:33.4	+1:45.8	B1	85	25:58.4
5	35	Thomas Clarion; Guide: Julien Bourla	France	30:38.5	+1:50.9	B1	85	26:02.7
6	38	Helge Flo; Guide: Stig Moland	Norway	30:52.0	+2:04.4	B1	85	26:14.2
7	33	Anatolii Kovalevskyi; Guide: Borys Babar	Ukraine	27:00.3	+2:01.8	B2	98	26:27.9
8	40	Vitaliy Lukyanenko; Guide: Dmytrio Khurtyk	Ukraine	26:40.6	+2:12.1	B3	100	26:40.6
9	42	Alexei Toropov; Guide: Sergey Maksimov	Russia	27:19.5	+2:21.0	B2	98	26:46.7
10	34	Iurii Utkin; Guide: Vitaliy Kazakov	Ukraine	27:32.4	+3:03.9	B3	100	27:32.4
11	41	Zebastian Modin; Guide: Albin Ackerot	Sweden	32:33.5	+3:45.9	B1	85	27:40.5
12	37	Filipp Spitsyn; Guide: Denis Kalabin	Russia	28:38.7	+4:10.2	B3	100	28:38.7
13	32	Oleg Antipin; Guide: Ilya Cherepanov	Russia	29:39.3	+4:40.8	B2	98	29:03.7
14	39	Dmytro Shulga; Guide: Sergiy Kycheryaviy	Ukraine	30:24.6	+5:26.1	B2	98	29:48.1
15	31	Hakan Axelsson; Guide: David Jahnsson	Sweden	30:43.8	+5:45.3	B2	98	30:06.9
