= 2011 IPC Biathlon and Cross-Country Skiing World Championships – Men's sprint =

The Men's sprint events in cross-country skiing at the 2011 IPC Biathlon and Cross-Country Skiing World Championships, were held on April 8, 2011.

== Medals ==
Class	Gold	Silver	Bronze
Sitting	Trygve Steinar Larsen; Norway	Chris Klebl; Canada	Irek Zaripov; Russia
Standing	Kirill Mikhaylov; Russia	Vegard Dahle; Norway	Vladimir Kononov; Russia
Visually impaired	Brian McKeever; Guide: Erik Carleton; Canada	Nikolay Polukhin; Guide: Andrey Tokarev; Russia	Alexei Toropov; Guide: Sergey Maksimov; Russia

== Results ==
=== Sitting ===
The men's 0.9 km sprint, sitting. Skiers compete on a sitski.

==== Qualification ====
Rank	Bib	Athlete	Country	Real time	Deficit	Class	%	Time (calculated)	Note
1	5	Trygve Steinar Larsen	Norway	1:59.19	0.0	LW12	100	1:59.1	Q
2	9	Roman Petushkov	Russia	1:59:78	+0.5	LW12	100	1:59.78	Q
3	4	Sergey Shilov	Russia	2:21.90	+3.3	LW10	86	2:02.03	Q
4	11	Dzmitry Loban	Belarus	2:02.33	+3.1	LW12	100	2:02.33	Q
5	8	Irek Zaripov	Russia	2:02.39	+3.1	LW12	100	2:02.39	Q
6	7	Chris Klebl	Canada	2:10.73	+3.9	LW11	94	2:02.89	Q
7	16	Romain Rosique	France	2:11.40	+4.6	LW11	94	2:03.52	Q
8	1	Sean Halsted	United States	2:07.00	+5.4	LW11.5	98	2:04.46	Q
9	6	Robert Wator	Poland	2:04.74	+5.5	LW12	100	2:04.74	
10	2	Kamil Rosiek	Poland	2:05.67	+6.4	LW12	100	2:05.67	
11	20	Yauheni Lukyanenka	Belarus	2:06.51	+7.3	LW12	100	2:06.51	
12	15	Igor Kuznetsov	Russia	2:10.43	+8.8	LW11.5	98	2:07.82	
13	12	Iurii Kostiuk	Ukraine	2:24.33	+13.3	LW10.5	91	2:11.34	
14	18	Alexey Bychenok	Russia	2:13.71	+14.5	LW12	100	2:13.71	
15	14	Mykhaylo Tkachenko	Ukraine	2:16.09	+16.8	LW12	100	2:16.09	
16	3	Nikolay Khlupenkov	Russia	2:17.83	+18.6	LW12	100	2:17.83	
17	19	Martin Fleig	Germany	2:20.66	+19.0	LW11.5	98	2:17.85	
18	13	Daniel Cnossen	United States	2:17.90	+18.7	LW12	100	2:17.90	
19	10	Thierry Raoux	France	3:00.71	+42.1	LW10	86	2:35.41	
	17	Sergiy Khyzhnyak	Ukraine	DNS		LW12	100		

==== Semifinals ====
Semifinal 1

Rank	Seed	Athlete	Country	Real time	Class	%	Time (calculated)	Deficit	Note
1	1	Trygve Steinar Larsen	Norway		LW12	100	2:12.3	0.0	Q
2	5	Irek Zaripov	Russia		LW12	100	2:13.4	+1.1	Q
3	8	Sean Halsted	United States		LW11.5	98	2:17.1	+4.8	
	4	Dzmitry Loban	Belarus	DNF	LW12	100			

Semifinal 2

Rank	Seed	Athlete	Country	Real time	Class	%	Time (calculated)	Deficit	Note
1	2	Roman Petushkov	Russia		LW12	100	2:32.4	0.0	Q
2	6	Chris Klebl	Canada		LW11	94	2:33.2	+0.8	Q
3	7	Romain Rosique	France		LW11	94	2:33.3	+0.9	
4	3	Sergey Shilov	Russia		LW10	86	3:01.5	+29.1	

==== Final ====
Rank	Bib	Athlete	Country	Real time	Class	%	Time (calculated)	Deficit	Note
1st place, gold medalist(s)	1	Trygve Steinar Larsen	Norway		LW12	100	2:15.5	0.0	
2nd place, silver medalist(s)	6	Chris Klebl	Canada		LW11	94	2:22.3	+6.8	
3rd place, bronze medalist(s)	5	Irek Zaripov	Russia		LW12	100	2:29.1	+13.6	
	2	Roman Petushkov	Russia	DNF	LW12	100			

==== Final standings ====
The final standings of the men's 0.9 km sprint, sitting.

Rank	Athlete	Country
1st place, gold medalist(s)	Trygve Steinar Larsen	Norway
2nd place, silver medalist(s)	Chris Klebl	Canada
3rd place, bronze medalist(s)	Irek Zaripov	Russia
4	Roman Petushkov	Russia
5	Romain Rosique	France
6	Sean Halsted	United States
7	Sergey Shilov	Russia
8	Dzmitry Loban	Belarus
9	Robert Wator	Poland
10	Kamil Rosiek	Poland
11	Yauheni Lukyanenka	Belarus
12	Igor Kuznetsov	Russia
13	Iurii Kostiuk	Ukraine
14	Alexey Bychenok	Russia
15	Mykhaylo Tkachenko	Ukraine
16	Nikolay Khlupenkov	Russia
17	Martin Fleig	Germany
18	Daniel Cnossen	United States
19	Thierry Raoux	France
DNS	Sergiy Khyzhnyak	Ukraine

=== Standing ===
The men's 1 km sprint free, standing.

==== Qualification ====
Rank	Bib	Athlete	Country	Real time	Deficit	Class	%	Time (calculated)	Note
1	78	Kirill Mikhaylov	Russia	2:44.68	0.0	LW4	96	2:38.09	Q
2	92	Sergey Lapkin	Russia	2:44.87	+0.1	LW4	96	2:38.28	Q
3	87	Vegard Dahle	Norway	2:54.76	+10.0	LW4	96	2:47.77	Q
4	73	Vladimir Kononov	Russia	3:14.21	+12.5	LW5/7	87	2:48.96	Q
5	77	Ilkka Tuomisto	Finland	2:55.96	+12.9	LW8	97	2:50.68	Q
6	91	Rushan Minnegulov	Russia	2:57.56	+14.5	LW8	97	2:52.23	Q
7	90	Grygorii Vovchynskyi	Ukraine	3:00.22	+17.2	LW8	97	2:54.81	Q
8	89	Konstantin Yanchuk	Russia	3:21.35	+19.6	LW5/7	87	2:55.17	Q
9	82	Vladislav Lekomtcev	Russia	3:02.90	+18.2	LW6	96	2:55.58	
10	71	Tino Uhlig	Germany	3:02.79	+19.7	LW8	97	2:57.31	
11	76	Oleg Balukhto	Russia	3:08.76	+24.0	LW6	96	3:01.21	
12	85	Vitalii Sytnyk	Ukraine	3:09.42	+24.7	LW6	96	3:01.84	
13	83	Oleh Leshchyshyn	Ukraine	3:09.52	+26.5	LW8	97	3:03.83	
14	79	Michael Kurz	Austria	3:20.16	+28.3	LW9	92	3:04.15	
15	86	Yannick Bourseaux	France	3:13.07	+28.3	LW6	96	3:05.35	
16	88	Azat Karachurin	Russia	3:34.20	+32.5	LW5/7	87	3:06.35	
17	81	Aleksandr Iaremchuk	Russia	3:17.90	+33.2	LW6	96	3:09.98	
18	80	Ivan Kodlozerov	Russia	3:17.73	+34.7	LW8	97	3:11.80	
19	74	Dmitry Shevchenko	Russia	3:19.63	+36.6	LW8	97	3:13.64	
20	75	Svein Lilleberg	Norway	3:52.41	+48.6	LW2	86	3:19.87	
21	72	Hakon Olsrud	Norway	3:26.17	+43.1	LW8	97	3:19.99	
22	84	Daniel Hathorn	United States	4:06.28	+1:23.2	LW8	97	3:58.89	

==== Semifinals ====
Semifinal 1

Rank	Seed	Athlete	Country	Real time	Class	%	Time (calculated)	Deficit	Note
1	1	Kirill Mikhaylov	Russia		LW4	96	3:14.0	0.0	Q
2	4	Vladimir Kononov	Russia		LW5/7	87	3:17.6	+3.6	Q
3	5	Ilkka Tuomisto	Finland		LW8	97	3:19.9	+5.9	
4	8	Konstantin Yanchuk	Russia		LW5/7	87	3:44.8	+30.8	

Semifinal 2

Rank	Seed	Athlete	Country	Real time	Class	%	Time (calculated)	Deficit	Note
1	3	Vegard Dahle	Norway		LW4	96	3:02.1	0.0	Q
2	6	Rushan Minnegulov	Russia		LW8	97	3:06.8	+4.7	Q
3	7	Grygorii Vovchynskyi	Ukraine		LW8	97	3:14.2	+12.1	
4	2	Sergey Lapkin	Russia		LW4	96	3:57.5	FST	

==== Final ====
Rank	Bib	Athlete	Country	Real time	Class	%	Time (calculated)	Deficit	Note
1st place, gold medalist(s)	1	Kirill Mikhaylov	Russia		LW4	96	3:10.7	0.0	
2nd place, silver medalist(s)	3	Vegard Dahle	Norway		LW4	96	3:15.0	+4.3	
3rd place, bronze medalist(s)	4	Vladimir Kononov	Russia		LW5/7	87	3:16.1	+5.4	
4	6	Rushan Minnegulov	Russia		LW8	97	3:19.9	+9.2	

==== Final standings ====
The final standings of the men's 1 km sprint, standing.

Rank	Athlete	Country
1st place, gold medalist(s)	Kirill Mikhaylov	Russia
2nd place, silver medalist(s)	Vegard Dahle	Norway
3rd place, bronze medalist(s)	Vladimir Kononov	Russia
4	Rushan Minnegulov	Russia
5	Ilkka Tuomisto	Finland
6	Grygorii Vovchynskyi	Ukraine
7	Konstantin Yanchuk	Russia
8	Sergey Lapkin	Russia
9	Vladislav Lekomtcev	Russia
10	Tino Uhlig	Germany
11	Oleg Balukhto	Russia
12	Vitalii Sytnyk	Ukraine
13	Oleh Leshchyshyn	Ukraine
14	Michael Kurz	Austria
15	Yannick Bourseaux	France
16	Azat Karachurin	Russia
17	Aleksandr Iaremchuk	Russia
18	Ivan Kodlozerov	Russia
19	Dmitry Shevchenko	Russia
20	Svein Lilleberg	Norway
21	Hakon Olsrud	Norway
22	Daniel Hathorn	United States

=== Visually impaired ===
The men's 1 km sprint free, visually impaired. Skiers with a visual impairment compete with a sighted guide. Dual medals are rewarded.

==== Qualification ====
Rank	Bib	Athlete	Country	Real time	Deficit	Class	%	Time (calculated)	Note
1	58	Brian McKeever; Guide: Erik Carleton	Canada	2:34.17	0.0	B3	100	2:34.17	Q
2	56	Zebastian Modin; Guide: Albin Ackerot	Sweden	3:08.54	+7.1	B1	85	2:40.26	Q
3	51	Nikolay Polukhin; Guide: Andrey Tokarev	Russia	2:45.11	+7.8	B2	98	2:41.81	Q
4	54	Vasili Shaptsiaboi; Guide: Mikalai Shablouski	Belarus	2:45.95	+8.6	B2	98	2:42.63	Q
5	52	Alexei Toropov; Guide: Sergey Maksimov	Russia	2:47.29	+9.9	B2	98	2:43.94	Q
6	59	Dmytro Shulga; Guide: Sergiy Kucheryaviy	Ukraine	2:48.73	+11.4	B2	98	2:45.36	Q
7	65	Helge Flo; Guide: Stig Moland	Norway	3:15.65	+14.2	B1	85	2:46.30	Q
8	60	Filipp Spitsyn; Guide: Denis Kalabin	Russia	2:50.65	+16.4	B3	100	2:50.65	Q
9	57	Anatolii Kovalevskyi; Guide: Borys Babar	Ukraine	2:56.82	+19.5	B2	98	2:53.28	
10	55	Oleg Antipin; Guide: Ilya Cherepanov	Russia	3:00.32	+23.0	B2	98	2:56.71	
11	53	Wilhelm Brem; Guide: Florian Grimm	Germany	3:33.23	+31.8	B1	85	3:01.25	
12	61	Iurii Utkin; Guide: Vitaliy Kazakov	Ukraine	3:01.71	+27.5	B3	100	3:01.71	
13	63	Hakan Axelsson; Guide: David Jahnsson	Sweden	3:10.84	+33.5	B2	98	3:07.02	
	62	Vitaliy Lukyanenko; Guide: Dmytro Khurtyk	Ukraine	DNS		B3	100		
	64	Thomas Clarion; Guide: Julien Bourla	France	DNS		B1	85		

==== Semifinals ====
Semifinal 1

Rank	Seed	Athlete	Country	Real time	Class	%	Time (calculated)	Deficit	Note
1	1	Brian McKeever; Guide: Erik Carleton	Canada		B3	100	2:51.9	0.0	Q
2	5	Alexei Toropov; Guide: Sergey Maksimov	Russia		B2	98	2:53.7	+1.8	Q
3	4	Vasili Shaptsiaboi; Guide: Mikalai Shablouski	Belarus		B2	98	2:59.3	+7.4	
4	8	Filipp Spitsyn; Guide: Denis Kalabin	Russia		B3	100	3:06.3	+14.4	

Semifinal 2

Rank	Seed	Athlete	Country	Real time	Class	%	Time (calculated)	Deficit	Note
1	3	Nikolay Polukhin; Guide: Andrey Tokarev	Russia		B2	98	3:18.7	0.0	Q
2	7	Helge Flo; Guide: Stig Moland	Norway		B1	85	3:19.8	+1.1	Q
3	6	Dmytro Shulga; Guide: Sergiy Kycheryaviy	Ukraine		B2	98	3:28.8	+10.1	
4	2	Zebastian Modin; Guide: Albin Ackerot	Sweden		B1	85	3:35.0	+16.3	

==== Final ====
Rank	Bib	Athlete	Country	Real time	Class	%	Time (calculated)	Deficit	Note
1st place, gold medalist(s)	1	Brian McKeever; Guide: Erik Carleton	Canada		B3	100	3:13.8	0.0	
2nd place, silver medalist(s)	3	Nikolay Polukhin; Guide: Andrey Tokarev	Russia		B2	98	3:18.2	+4.4	
3rd place, bronze medalist(s)	5	Alexei Toropov; Guide: Sergey Maksimov	Russia		B2	98	3:21.8	+8.0	
4	7	Helge Flo; Guide: Stig Moland	Norway		B1	85	3:23.5	+9.7	

==== Final standings ====
The final standings of the men's 1 km sprint free, visually impaired.

Rank	Athlete	Country
1st place, gold medalist(s)	Brian McKeever; Guide: Erik Carleton	Canada
2nd place, silver medalist(s)	Nikolay Polukhin; Guide: Andrey Tokarev	Russia
3rd place, bronze medalist(s)	Alexei Toropov; Guide: Sergey Maksimov	Russia
4	Helge Flo; Guide: Stig Moland	Norway
5	Vasili Shaptsiaboi; Guide: Mikalai Shablouski	Belarus
6	Dmytro Shulga; Guide: Sergiy Kucheryaviy	Ukraine
7	Zebastian Modin; Guide: Albin Ackerot	Sweden
8	Filipp Spitsyn; Guide: Denis Kalabin	Russia
9	Anatolii Kovalevskyi; Guide: Borys Babar	Ukraine
10	Oleg Antipin; Guide: Ilya Cherepanov	Russia
11	Wilhelm Brem; Guide: Florian Grimm	Germany
12	Iurii Utkin; Guide: Vitaliy Kazakov	Ukraine
13	Hakan Axelsson; Guide: David Jahnsson	Sweden
DNS	Vitaliy Lukyanenko; Guide: Dmytro Khurtyk	Ukraine
DNS	Thomas Clarion; Guide: Julien Bourla	France

== See also ==
- FIS Nordic World Ski Championships 2011 – Men's sprint
