= 2011 IPC Biathlon and Cross-Country Skiing World Championships – Men's 15 and 20 kilometre classical =

The Men's long distance events in cross-country skiing, 20 km classical for category standing and visually impaired and 15 km classical for sitting, were held on April 4 and 5 as part of the 2011 IPC Biathlon and Cross-Country Skiing World Championships.

== Medals ==
Class	Gold	Silver	Bronze
Sitting	Chris Klebl; Canada	Irek Zaripov; Russia	Enzo Masiello; Italy
Standing	Kirill Mikhaylov; Russia	Vegard Dahle; Norway	Ilkka Tuomisto; Finland
Visually impaired	Brian McKeever; Guide: Erik Carleton; Canada	Nikolay Polukhin; Guide: Andrey Tokarev; Russia	Alexei Toropov; Guide: Sergey Maksimov; Russia

== Results ==
=== Sitting ===
April 5

Rank	Bib	Athlete	Country	Real time	Deficit	Class	%	Time (calculated)
1st place, gold medalist(s)	18	Chris Klebl	Canada	37:50.9	0.0	LW11	94	35:34.6
2nd place, silver medalist(s)	12	Irek Zaripov	Russia	35:43.6	+9.0	LW12	100	35:43.6
3rd place, bronze medalist(s)	7	Enzo Masiello	Italy	38:34.6	+43.7	LW11	94	36:15.7
4	17	Kamil Rosiek	Poland	36:35.1	+1:00.5	LW12	100	36:35.1
5	16	Aliaksandr Davidovich	Belarus	37:13.9	+1:39.3	LW12	100	37:13.9
6	1	Yauheni Lukyanenka	Belarus	37:21.1	+1:46.5	LW12	100	37:21.1
7	9	Sergey Shilov	Russia	43:28.7	+2:06.6	LW10	86	37:23.5
8	14	Roman Petushkov	Russia	37:27.8	+1:53.2	LW12	100	37:27.8
9	5	Igor Kuznetsov	Russia	38:44.2	+2:26.0	LW11.5	98	37:57.7
10	11	Sean Halsted	United States	38:52.2	+2:34.0	LW11.5	98	38:05.6
11	15	Robert Wator	Poland	38:44.1	+3:09.5	LW12	100	38:44.1
12	2	Alexey Bychenok	Russia	39:57.5	+4:22.9	LW12	100	39:57.5
13	4	Mykhaylo Tkachenko	Ukraine	40:05.2	+4:30.6	LW12	100	40:05.2
14	3	Daniel Cnossen	United States	42:45.2	+7:10.6	LW12	100	42:45.2
	8	Dzmitry Loban	Belarus	DNF		LW12	100	
	10	Trygve Steinar Larsen	Norway	DNF		LW12	100	
	6	Romain Rosique	France	DNS		LW11	94	
	13	Nikolay Khlupenkov	Russia	DNS		LW12	100	

=== Standing ===
April 4

Rank	Bib	Athlete	Country	Real time	Deficit	Class	%	Time (calculated)
1st place, gold medalist(s)	16	Kirill Mikhaylov	Russia	56:07.7	0.0	LW4	96	53:53.0
2nd place, silver medalist(s)	6	Vegard Dahle	Norway	58:21.2	+2:13.5	LW4	96	56:01.2
3rd place, bronze medalist(s)	15	Ilkka Tuomisto	Finland	1:02:21.9	+3:47.8	LW8	92	57:22.5
4	12	Tino Uhlig	Germany	1:02:55.6	+4:21.5	LW8	92	57:53.6
5	14	Svein Lilleberg	Norway	1:03:38.0	+4:25.3	LW2	91	57:54.4
6	5	Rushan Minnegulov	Russia	1:03:48.7	+5:14.6	LW8	92	58:42.4
7	9	Grygorii Vovchynskyi	Ukraine	1:05:36.1	+7:02.0	LW8	92	1:00:21.2
8	11	Oleg Balukhto	Russia	1:06:26.0	+7:13.3	LW6	91	1:00:27.3
9	17	Dmitry Shevchenko	Russia	1:05:55.3	+7:21.2	LW8	92	1:00:38.9
10	8	Mark Arendz	Canada	1:07:38.3	+8:25.6	LW6	91	1:01:33.1
11	4	Oleh Leshchyshyn	Ukraine	1:09:12.1	+10:38.0	LW8	92	1:03:39.9
12	10	Michael Kurz	Austria	1:10:40.9	+11:28.2	LW9	91	1:04:19.2
13	3	Vitalii Sytnyk	Ukraine	1:12:45.2	+13:32.5	LW6	91	1:06:12.3
	1	Yannick Bourseaux	France	DNF		LW6	91	
	7	Siarhei Silchanka	Belarus	DNF		LW8	92	
	13	Vladimir Kononov	Russia	DNF		LW5/7	79	
	2	Azat Karachurin	Russia	DNS		LW5/7	79	

=== Visually impaired ===
April 4

Rank	Bib	Athlete	Country	Real time	Deficit	Class	%	Time (calculated)
1st place, gold medalist(s)	28	Brian McKeever; Guide: Erik Carleton	Canada	53:26.7	0.0	B3	100	53:26.7
2nd place, silver medalist(s)	29	Nikolay Polukhin; Guide: Andrey Tokarev	Russia	55:16.3	+44.2	B2	98	54:10.0
3rd place, bronze medalist(s)	30	Alexei Toropov; Guide: Sergey Maksimov	Russia	59:54.1	+5:22.0	B2	98	58:42.2
4	25	Helge Flo; Guide: Stig Moland	Norway	1:08:57.7	+7:31.8	B1	87	59:59.8
5	23	Iurii Utkin; Guide: Vitaliy Kazakov	Ukraine	1:00:12.9	+6:46.2	B3	100	1:00:12.9
6	24	Filipp Spitsyn; Guide: Denis Kalabin	Russia	1:00:20.5	+6:53.8	B3	100	1:00:20.5
7	26	Oleg Antipin; Guide: Ilya Cherepanov	Russia	1:04:31.3	+9:59.2	B2	98	1:03:13.9
8	21	Thomas Clarion; Guide: Julien Bourla	France	1:15:21.3	+13:55.4	B1	87	1:05:33.5
9	22	Hakan Axelsson; Guide: David Jahnsson	Sweden	1:10:14.3	+15:42.2	B2	98	1:08:50.0
	31	Vasili Shaptsiaboi; Guide: Mikalai Shablouski	Belarus	DNF		B2	98	
	27	Zebastian Modin; Guide: Albin Ackerot	Sweden	DNS		B1	87	
