= 2011 IPC Biathlon and Cross-Country Skiing World Championships – Men's long distance =

The men's 12.5 km long distance competitions in biathlon of the 2011 IPC Biathlon and Cross-Country Skiing World Championships were held on April 10, 2011.

== Medals ==
Class	Gold	Silver	Bronze
Sitting	Irek Zaripov; Russia	Ivan Goncharov; Russia	Sergiy Khyzhnyak; Ukraine
Standing	Grygorii Vovchynskyi; Ukraine	Nils-Erik Ulset; Norway	Yannick Bourseaux; France
Visually impaired	Nikolay Polukhin; Guide: Andrey Tokarev; Russia	Brian McKeever; Guide: Erik Carleton; Canada	Anatolii Kovalevskyi; Guide: Borys Babar; Ukraine

== Results ==
=== Sitting ===
The men's 12.5 km, sitting. Skiers compete on a sitski.

==== Final ====
Rank	Bib	Name	Country	Penalties (P+P+P+P)	Time (calculated)	Deficit
1st place, gold medalist(s)	14	Irek Zaripov	Russia	0+0+1+0	34:51.7	
2nd place, silver medalist(s)	15	Ivan Goncharov	Russia	0+0+0+0	35:47.1	
3rd place, bronze medalist(s)	8	Sergiy Khyzhnyak	Ukraine	0+1+0+1	37:19.0	
4	1	Sergey Shilov	Russia	0+0+0+2	37:35.9	
5	5	Aliaksandr Davidovich	Belarus	0+1+1+1	38:13.4	
6	7	Mykhaylo Tkachenko	Ukraine	0+0+2+0	38:41.5	
7	18	Martin Fleig	Germany	0+0+1+0	38:42.6	
8	3	Iurii Kostiuk	Ukraine	1+0+1+2	38:55.1	
9	4	Enzo Masiello	Italy	1+1+0+1	39:18.5	
10	9	Dzmitry Loban	Belarus	2+2+0+0	39:54.0	
11	2	Romain Rosique	France	2+1+2+0	40:22.0	
12	12	Daniel Cnossen	United States	0+1+0+0	41:01.5	
13	10	Kamil Rosiek	Poland	0+3+2+1	41:35.2	
14	17	Alexey Bychenok	Russia	2+1+2+1	42:36.6	
15	6	Sean Halsted	United States	1+0+2+2	42:55.6	
16	16	Trygve Steinar Larsen	Norway	4+2+2+0	44:10.4	
17	13	Thierry Raoux	France	0+0+1+2	44:49.0	
	11	Roland Ruepp	Italy		DNS	
	19	Roman Petushkov	Russia		DNS	

=== Standing ===
The men's 12.5 km, standing.

==== Final ====
Rank	Bib	Name	Country	Penalties (P+P+P+P)	Time (calculated)	Deficit
1st place, gold medalist(s)	39	Grygorii Vovchynskyi	Ukraine	0+1+0+0	39:03.2	
2nd place, silver medalist(s)	47	Nils-Erik Ulset	Norway	0+1+0+0	39:08.6	
3rd place, bronze medalist(s)	36	Yannick Bourseaux	France	0+0+0+0	39:13.3	
4	45	Mark Arendz	Canada	0+0+0+0	40:15.3	
5	44	Kirill Mikhaylov	Russia	0+2+0+1	41:04.8	
6	50	Oleg Balukhto	Russia	0+0+0+1	41:28.4	
7	37	Vitalii Sytnyk	Ukraine	0+0+1+0	41:55.4	
8	40	Oleh Leshchyshyn	Ukraine	1+0+1+0	42:19.4	
9	33	Siarhei Silchanka	Belarus	0+1+1+0	42:26.7	
10	48	Valery Darovskikh	Russia	0+1+2+0	44:13.6	
11	46	Ivan Kodlozerov	Russia	0+0+1+1	45:33.7	
12	31	Tino Uhlig	Germany	0+0+2+2	45:43.3	
13	49	Azat Karachurin	Russia	2+1+1+0	46:15.3	
14	38	Aleksandr Iaremchuk	Russia	2+0+1+0	46:18.1	
15	41	Michael Kurz	Austria	0+2+1+3	46:18.2	
16	34	Vladislav Lekomtcev	Russia	3+2+0+2	49:02.3	
17	43	Konstantin Yanchuk	Russia	0+2+0+2	50:09.4	
18	35	Dmitry Shevchenko	Russia	1+3+3+3	52:22.1	
19	32	Daniel Hathorn	United States	1+2+2+2	53:25.0	
	42	Rushan Minnegulov	Russia		DNS	

=== Visually impaired ===
In the men's 12.5 km, visually impaired, skiers with a visual impairment compete with a sighted guide. Dual medals are rewarded.

==== Final ====
Rank	Bib	Name	Country	Penalties (P+P+P+P)	Time (calculated)	Deficit
1st place, gold medalist(s)	72	Nikolay Polukhin; Guide: Andrey Tokarev	Russia	0+0+0+0	38:22.1	
2nd place, silver medalist(s)	62	Brian McKeever; Guide: Erik Carleton	Canada	0+1+1+0	41:57.3	
3rd place, bronze medalist(s)	65	Anatolii Kovalevskyi; Guide: Borys Babar	Ukraine	0+0+0+1	42:51.6	
4	63	Wilhelm Brem; Guide: Florian Grimm	Germany	0+1+1+0	43:03.3	
5	67	Vitaliy Lukyanenko; Guide: Dmytro Khurtyk	Ukraine	0+1+0+0	43:31.2	
6	71	Vasili Shaptsiaboi; Guide: Mikalai Shablouski	Belarus	1+1+2+1	44:00.2	
7	61	Thomas Clarion; Guide: Julien Bourla	France	1+0+2+0	46:07.5	
8	70	Alexei Toropov; Guide: Sergey Maksimov	Russia	2+0+0+2	46:44.5	
9	69	Filipp Spitsyn; Guide: Denis Kalabin	Russia	0+2+2+0	48:39.2	
10	66	Iurii Utkin; Guide: Vitaliy Kazakov	Ukraine	1+1+1+1	49:01.9	
11	64	Oleg Antipin; Guide: Ilya Cherepanov	Russia	0+2+2+1	51:03.0	
12	68	Dmytro Shulga; Guide: Sergiy Kycheryaviy	Ukraine	1+1+1+0	52:05.1	
