= 2011 IPC Biathlon and Cross-Country Skiing World Championships – Men's 7.5 km =

The men's 7.5 km competitions in biathlon of the 2011 IPC Biathlon and Cross-Country Skiing World Championships were held on April 7, 2011.

== Medals ==
Class	Gold	Silver	Bronze
Sitting	Irek Zaripov; Russia	Kamil Rosiek; Poland	Roman Petushkov; Russia
Standing	Kirill Mikhaylov; Russia	Nils-Erik Ulset; Norway	Oleg Balukhto; Russia
Visually impaired	Nikolay Polukhin; Guide: Andrey Tokarev; Russia	Vasili Shaptsiaboi; Guide: Mikalai Shablouski; Belarus	Wilhelm Brem; Guide: Florian Grimm; Germany

== Results ==
=== Sitting ===
The men's 7.5 km, sitting. Skiers compete on a sitski.

==== Final ====
Rank	Bib	Name	Country	Penalties (P+P)	Time (calculated)	Deficit
1st place, gold medalist(s)	14	Irek Zaripov	Russia	0 (0+0)	19:37.0	0.0
2nd place, silver medalist(s)	9	Kamil Rosiek	Poland	0 (0+0)	20:19.7	+42.7
3rd place, bronze medalist(s)	17	Roman Petushkov	Russia	2 (0+2)	20:41.9	+1:04.9
4	3	Sergey Shilov	Russia	0 (0+0)	21:00.0	+1:23.0
5	12	Iurii Kostiuk	Ukraine	1 (1+0)	21:03.8	+1:26.8
6	19	Ivan Goncharov	Russia	0 (0+0)	21:07.1	+1:30.1
7	11	Romain Rosique	France	2 (0+2)	21:22.3	+1:45.3
8	1	Dzmitry Loban	Belarus	3 (2+1)	22:03.4	+2:26.4
9	4	Mykhaylo Tkachenko	Ukraine	1 (1+0)	22:04.0	+2:27.0
10	10	Enzo Masiello	Italy	3 (1+2)	22:14.6	+2:37.6
11	7	Aliaksandr Davidovich	Belarus	3 (1+2)	22:19.9	+2:42.9
12	8	Sergiy Khyzhnyak	Ukraine	2 (0+2)	22:22.9	+2:45.9
13	15	Alexey Bychenok	Russia	3 (1+2)	22:50.5	+3:13.5
14	16	Martin Fleig	Germany	2 (0+2)	23:06.5	+3:29.5
15	13	Sean Halsted	United States	3 (2+1)	23:26.9	+3:49.9
16	5	Thierry Raoux	France	1 (0+1)	24:30.2	+4:53.2
17	6	Daniel Cnossen	United States	4 (1+3)	25:55.7	+6:18.7
	2	Roland Ruepp	Italy		DNF	
	18	Trygve Steinar Larsen	Norway		DNF	

=== Standing ===
The men's 7.5 km, standing.

==== Final ====
Rank	Bib	Name	Country	Penalties (P+P)	Time (calculated)	Deficit
1st place, gold medalist(s)	45	Kirill Mikhaylov	Russia	2 (0+2)	20:41.5	0.0
2nd place, silver medalist(s)	46	Nils-Erik Ulset	Norway	0 (0+0)	21:00.7	+19.2
3rd place, bronze medalist(s)	47	Oleg Balukhto	Russia	0 (0+0)	21:18.1	+36.6
4	43	Azat Karachurin	Russia	2 (1+1)	21:42.8	+1:01.3
5	32	Yannick Bourseaux	France	1 (0+1)	21:56.1	+1:14.6
6	48	Mark Arendz	Canada	1 (1+0)	22:05.3	+1:23.8
7	37	Oleh Leshchyshyn	Ukraine	1 (1+0)	22:13.8	+1:32.3
8	49	Valery Darovskikh	Russia	1 (0+1)	22:38.1	+1:56.6
9	35	Vitalii Sytnyk	Ukraine	1 (0+1)	22:45.7	+2:04.2
10	39	Grygorii Vovchynskyi	Ukraine	3 (0+3)	22:47.9	+2:06.4
11	34	Vladislav Lekomtcev	Russia	1 (0+1)	22:55.5	+2:14.0
12	38	Michael Kurz	Austria	3 (2+1)	23:17.3	+2:35.8
13	44	Ivan Kodlozerov	Russia	2 (1+1)	23:32.8	+2:51.3
14	41	Siarhei Silchanka	Belarus	3 (2+1)	23:42.7	+3:01.2
15	40	Aleksandr Iaremchuk	Russia	1 (1+0)	23:49.1	+3:07.6
16	36	Rushan Minnegulov	Russia	4 (2+2)	24:09.4	+3:27.9
17	42	Tino Uhlig	Germany	3 (1+2)	24:30.0	+3:48.5
18	33	Daniel Hathorn	United States	3 (1+2)	27:15.6	+6:34.1
19	31	Konstantin Yanchuk	Russia	6 (4+2)	28:35.0	+7:53.5

=== Visually impaired ===
In the men's 7.5 km, visually impaired, skiers with a visual impairment compete with a sighted guide. Dual medals are rewarded.

==== Final ====
Rank	Bib	Name	Country	Penalties (P+P)	Time (calculated)	Deficit
1st place, gold medalist(s)	69	Nikolay Polukhin; Guide: Andrey Tokarev	Russia	1 (1+0)	21:09.9	0.0
2nd place, silver medalist(s)	70	Vasili Shaptsiaboi; Guide: Mikalai Shablouski	Belarus	0 (0+0)	21:40.8	+30.9
3rd place, bronze medalist(s)	61	Wilhelm Brem; Guide: Florian Grimm	Germany	0 (0+0)	21:59.1	+49.2
4	71	Alexei Toropov; Guide: Sergey Maksimov	Russia	1 (0+1)	22:36.3	+1:26.4
5	67	Vitaliy Lukyanenko; Guide: Dmytro Khurtyk	Ukraine	2 (2+0)	22:58.4	+1:48.5
6	64	Thomas Clarion; Guide: Julien Bourla	France	1 (1+0)	23:25.2	+2:15.3
7	62	Dmytro Shulga; Guide: Sergiy Kycheryaviy	Ukraine	0 (0+0)	24:03.1	+2:53.2
8	66	Anatolii Kovalevskyi; Guide: Borys Babar	Ukraine	5 (4+1)	24:31.6	+3:21.7
9	65	Stanislav Chokhlaev; Guide: Sergey Syniakin	Russia	0 (0+0)	24:38.4	+3:28.5
10	68	Filipp Spitsyn; Guide: Denis Kalabin	Russia	2 (1+1)	25:24.4	+4:14.5
11	63	Iurii Utkin; Guide: Vitaliy Kazakov	Ukraine	6 (2+4)	26:35.3	+5:25.4
