= 2011 IPC Biathlon and Cross-Country Skiing World Championships – Men's pursuit =

The men's pursuit competitions in biathlon of the 2011 IPC Biathlon and Cross-Country Skiing World Championships were held on April 2, 2011.

== Medals ==
Class	Gold	Silver	Bronze
Sitting	Roman Petushkov; Russia	Irek Zaripov; Russia	Ivan Goncharov; Russia
Standing	Grygorii Vovchynskyi; Ukraine	Azat Karachurin; Russia	Kirill Mikhaylov; Russia
Visually impaired	Anatolii Kovalevskyi; Guide: Borys Babar; Ukraine	Nikolay Polukhin; Guide: Andrey Tokarev; Russia	Vasili Shaptsiaboi; Guide: Mikalai Shablouski; Belarus

== Results ==
=== Sitting ===
The men's 3 km pursuit, sitting. Skiers compete on a sitski.

==== Qualification ====
09:00 local time

Rank	Bib	Name	Country	Penalties (P+P)	Time (calculated)	Deficit
1	6	Roman Petushkov	Russia	0 (0+0)	9:32.1	0.00
2	4	Irek Zaripov	Russia	1 (0+1)	9:46.0	+13.91
3	12	Iurii Kostiuk	Ukraine	1 (0+1)	9:58.8	+26.69
4	1	Ivan Goncharov	Russia	0 (0+0)	10:10.9	+38.85
5	15	Romain Rosique	France	2 (0+2)	10:22.1	+50.04
6	16	Sergiy Khyzhnyak	Ukraine	2 (1+1)	10:41.3	+1:09.26
7	13	Sergey Shilov	Russia	2 (1+1)	10:42.1	+1:10.05
8	17	Aliaksandr Davidovich	Belarus	1 (0+1)	10:44.0	+1.11.96
9	2	Trygve Steinar Larsen	Norway	3 (3+0)	10:56.5	+1:24.39
10	5	Alexey Bychenok	Russia	3 (0+3)	11:23.0	+1:50.92
11	3	Martin Fleig	Germany	3 (0+3)	11:38.5	+2:06.38
12	8	Kamil Rosiek	Poland	7 (5+2)	12:14.8	+2:42.70
13	10	Enzo Masiello	Italy	6 (4+2)	12:21.1	+2:49.07
14	18	Sean Halsted	United States	4 (1+3)	12:30.6	+2:58.49
15	11	Mykhaylo Tkachenko	Ukraine	7 (3+4)	12:51.6	+3:19.48
16	7	Thierry Raoux	France	2 (0+2)	12:59.0	+3:26.96
17	9	Daniel Cnossen	United States	4 (1+3)	13:03.1	+3:31.05
18	19	Roland Ruepp	Italy	7 (4+3)	14:31.7	+4:59.66
	14	Dzmitry Loban	Belarus		DNS	

==== Final ====
15:10 local time

Rank	Bib	Name	Country	Penalties (P+P)	Time (calculated)	Deficit
1st place, gold medalist(s)	5	Roman Petushkov	Russia	1 (0+1)	9:59.0	0.0
2nd place, silver medalist(s)	6	Irek Zaripov	Russia	0 (0+0)	10:08.0	+9.0
3rd place, bronze medalist(s)	8	Ivan Goncharov	Russia	1 (1+0)	11:33.8	+1:34.8
4	11	Trygve Steinar Larsen	Norway	1 (0+1)	12:04.7	+2:05.7
5	7	Romain Rosique	France	4 (2+2)	12:16.0	+2:17.0
6	12	Alexey Bychenok	Russia	0 (0+0)	12:22.0	+2:23.0
7	4	Sergey Shilov	Russia	3 (1+2)	12:37.1	+2:38.1
8	13	Martin Fleig	Germany	0 (0+0)	13:04.1	+3:05.1
9	3	Iurii Kostiuk	Ukraine	6 (3+3)	13:04.7	+3:05.7
10	14	Kamil Rosiek	Poland	1 (1+0)	13:22.6	+3:23.6
11	9	Sergiy Khyzhnyak	Ukraine	8 (4+4)	15:07.0	+5:08.0
12	10	Aliaksandr Davidovich	Belarus	7 (5+2)	15:17.0	+5:18.0

=== Standing ===
The men's 3.6 km pursuit, standing.

==== Qualification ====
09:30 local time

Rank	Bib	Name	Country	Penalties (P+P)	Time (calculated)	Deficit
1	44	Grygorii Vovchynskyi	Ukraine	0 (0+0)	9:03.1	0.00
2	36	Azat Karachurin	Russia	1 (1+0)	9:13.3	+10.24
3	32	Kirill Mikhaylov	Russia	2 (1+1)	9:15.4	+12.30
4	31	Mark Arendz	Canada	1 (0+1)	9:33.6	+30.57
5	35	Oleg Balukhto	Russia	0 (0+0)	9:36.2	+33.09
6	39	Oleh Leshchyshyn	Ukraine	1 (0+1)	9:41.6	+38.58
7	37	Valery Darovskikh	Russia	1 (0+1)	10:01.4	+58.32
8	33	Nils-Erik Ulset	Norway	3 (1+2)	10:12.7	+1:09.64
9	47	Konstantin Yanchuk	Russia	2 (0+2)	10:14.7	+1:11.59
10	45	Siarhei Silchanka	Belarus	1 (0+1)	10:17.6	+1:14.50
11	34	Ivan Kodlozerov	Russia	1 (0+1)	10:22.4	+1:19.37
12	46	Rushan Minnegulov	Russia	2 (2+0)	10:40.9	+1:37.82
13	48	Michael Kurz	Austria	2 (1+1)	10:48.8	+1:45.69
14	42	Aleksandr Iaremchuk	Russia	2 (2+0)	10:56.4	+1:53.33
15	40	Vitalii Sytnyk	Ukraine	3 (1+2)	10:56.6	+1:53.50
16	38	Yannick Bourseaux	France	3 (2+1)	11:04.0	+2:00.94
17	41	Vladislav Lekomtcev	Russia	4 (1+3)	11:21.7	+2:18.59
18	43	Daniel Hathorn	United States	2 (1+1)	11:30.4	+2:27.29

==== Final ====
16:00 local time

Rank	Bib	Name	Country	Penalties (P+P)	Time (calculated)	Deficit
1st place, gold medalist(s)	34	Grygorii Vovchynskyi	Ukraine	1 (0+1)	10:21.0	0.0
2nd place, silver medalist(s)	33	Azat Karachurin	Russia	2 (1+1)	10:25.1	+4.1
3rd place, bronze medalist(s)	35	Kirill Mikhaylov	Russia	2 (1+1)	10:26.6	+5.6
4	38	Mark Arendz	Canada	0 (0+0)	10:44.2	+23.2
5	39	Oleg Balukhto	Russia	2 (0+2)	11:39.0	+1:18.0
6	41	Valery Darovskikh	Russia	1 (0+1)	12:08.7	+1:47.7
7	40	Oleh Leshchyshyn	Ukraine	3 (3+0)	12:14.6	+1:53.6
8	37	Nils-Erik Ulset	Norway	3 (1+2)	12:28.6	+2:07.6
9	43	Ivan Kodlozerov	Russia	1 (1+0)	12:32.4	+2:11.4
10	42	Siarhei Silchanka	Belarus	2 (0+2)	12:57.6	+2:36.6
11	44	Rushan Minnegulov	Russia	2 (1+1)	14:31.7	+4:10.7
12	36	Konstantin Yanchuk	Russia	5 (2+3)	15:25.2	+5:04.2

=== Visually impaired ===
In the men's 3.6 km pursuit, visually impaired, skiers with a visual impairment compete with a sighted guide. Dual medals are rewarded.

==== Qualification ====
10:10 local time

Rank	Bib	Name	Country	Penalties (P+P)	Time (calculated)	Deficit
1	61	Nikolay Polukhin; Guide: Andrey Tokarev	Russia	1 (1+0)	9:04.5	0.00
2	64	Anatolii Kovalevskyi; Guide: Borys Babar	Ukraine	0 (0+0)	9:11.8	+7.30
3	62	Vasili Shaptsiaboi; Guide: Mikalai Shablouski	Belarus	0 (0+0)	9:26.4	+21.92
4	63	Alexei Toropov; Guide: Sergey Maksimov	Russia	0 (0+0)	9:29.6	+25.05
5	68	Thomas Clarion; Guide: Julien Bourla	France	0 (0+0)	10:05.2	+1:00.73
6	67	Dmytro Shulga; Guide: Sergiy Kycheryaviy	Ukraine	2 (1+1)	10:09.3	+1:04.82
7	65	Vitaliy Lukyanenko; Guide: Dmytrio Khurtyk	Ukraine	2 (0+2)	10:11.7	+1:07.15
8	70	Wilhelm Brem; Guide: Florian Grimm	Germany	0 (0+0)	10:17.1	+1:12.61
9	71	Filipp Spitsyn; Guide: Denis Kalabin	Russia	2 (0+2)	10:50.6	+1:46.07
10	66	Oleg Antipin; Guide: Tatiana Maltseva	Russia	2 (1+1)	11:11.8	+2:07.32
11	69	Iurii Utkin; Guide: Vitaliy Kazakov	Ukraine	5 (3+2)	11:25.4	+2:20.89

==== Final ====
16:50 local time

Rank	Bib	Name	Country	Penalties (P+P)	Time (calculated)	Deficit
1st place, gold medalist(s)	66	Anatolii Kovalevskyi; Guide: Borys Babar	Ukraine	0 (0+0)	9:25.1	0.0
2nd place, silver medalist(s)	64	Nikolay Polukhin; Guide: Andrey Tokarev	Russia	2 (2+0)	9:40.0	+14.9
3rd place, bronze medalist(s)	67	Vasili Shaptsiaboi; Guide: Mikalai Shablouski	Belarus	3 (3+0)	10:28.9	+1:03.8
4	70	Vitaliy Lukyanenko; Guide: Dmytrio Khurtyk	Ukraine	0 (0+0)	10:37.0	+1:11.9
5	69	Dmytro Shulga; Guide: Sergiy Kycheryaviy	Ukraine	0 (0+0)	10:45.2	+1:20.1
6	68	Alexei Toropov; Guide: Sergey Maksimov	Russia	4 (3+1)	11:01.5	+1:36.4
7	65	Wilhelm Brem; Guide: Florian Grimm	Germany	0 (0+0)	11:59.7	+2:34.6
8	63	Thomas Clarion; Guide: Julien Bourla	France	2 (0+2)	12:07.5	+2:42.4
9	72	Oleg Antipin; Guide: Tatiana Maltseva	Russia	2 (1+1)	12:53.2	+3:28.1
10	71	Filipp Spitsyn; Guide: Denis Kalabin	Russia	3 (1+2)	12:54.4	+3:29.3
11	73	Iurii Utkin; Guide: Vitaliy Kazakov	Ukraine	7 (3+4)	13:44.0	+4:18.9

== See also ==
- Biathlon World Championships 2011 – Men's pursuit
