= 2011 IPC Biathlon and Cross-Country Skiing World Championships =

- Host city: Khanty-Mansiysk, Russia
- Nations: 13
- Athletes: 102
- Dates: 2 April - 10 April

The 2011 IPC Biathlon and Cross-Country Skiing World Championships took place from 2–11 April 2011 in Khanty-Mansiysk, Russia. IPC stands for International Paralympic Committee. This was the first time these championships were hosted in Russia, and the first time the championships were hosted in the same city as the IBU Biathlon World Championships which was held in Khanty-Mansiysk from March 3 to March 13, 2011.

Skiers competed in sitting, standing, or visually impaired classification categories in various biathlon and cross-country skiing events.

The Opening ceremony was held on March 31, and the Closing ceremony was scheduled to be held on April 10.

Canadian Brian McKeever competed at the Championships without his brother Robin McKeever as his sighted guide, who recently had knee surgery.

The Championships can be seen free at IPC's internet TV channel ParalympicSport.TV as video on demand.

== Schedule of events ==
The provisional schedule of the event is below. All times in UTC+3.

Day	Date	Time	Sport	Event	Class
Saturday	April 2	13:00	Biathlon	Pursuit	Standing (LW2-9)
Saturday	April 2	13:00	Biathlon	Pursuit	Visual impairment (B1-3)
Saturday	April 2	13:00	Biathlon	Pursuit	Sitting (LW10-12)
Sunday	April 3	11:00	Cross-Country Skiing	Middle	Standing (LW2-9)
Sunday	April 3	11:00	Cross-Country Skiing	Middle	Visual impairment (B1-3)
Sunday	April 3	11:00	Cross-Country Skiing	Middle	Sitting (LW10-12)
Monday	April 4	11:00	Cross-Country Skiing	Long	Standing (LW2-9)
Monday	April 4	11:00	Cross-Country Skiing	Long	Visual impairment (B1-3)
Tuesday	April 5	11:00	Cross-Country Skiing	Long	Sitting (LW10-12)
Thursday	April 7	11:00	Biathlon	7.5 km	Standing (LW2-9)
Thursday	April 7	11:00	Biathlon	7.5 km	Visual impairment (B1-3)
Thursday	April 7	11:00	Biathlon	7.5 km	Sitting (LW10-12)
Friday	April 8	16:00	Cross-Country Skiing	Sprint	Standing (LW2-9)
Friday	April 8	16:00	Cross-Country Skiing	Sprint	Visual impairment (B1-3)
Friday	April 8	16:00	Cross-Country Skiing	Sprint	Sitting (LW10-12)
Saturday	April 9	13:00	Cross-Country Skiing	Relay	open
Sunday	April 10	10:00	Biathlon	12.5 km	Standing (LW2-9)
Sunday	April 10	10:00	Biathlon	12.5 km	Visual impairment (B1-3)
Sunday	April 10	10:00	Biathlon	10 km	Sitting (LW10-12)

== Medal winners ==
Calculated times

=== Biathlon ===
==== Men ====
Event	Class	Gold		Silver		Bronze	
Pursuit	visually impaired	Anatolii Kovalevskyi; Guide: Borys Babar; Ukraine	9:25.1	Nikolay Polukhin; Guide: Andrey Tokarev; Russia	9:40.0	Vasili Shaptsiaboi; Guide: Mikalai Shablouski; Belarus	10:28.9
Pursuit	sitting	Roman Petushkov; Russia	9:59.0	Irek Zaripov; Russia	10:08.0	Ivan Goncharov; Russia	11:33.8
Pursuit	standing	Grygorii Vovchynskyi; Ukraine	10:21.0	Azat Karachurin; Russia	10:25.1	Kirill Mikhaylov; Russia	10:26.6
Individual	visually impaired	Nikolay Polukhin; Guide: Andrey Tokarev; Russia	38:22.1	Brian McKeever; Guide: Erik Carleton; Canada	41:57.3	Anatolii Kovalevskyi; Guide: Borys Babar; Ukraine	42:51.6
Individual	sitting	Irek Zaripov; Russia	34:51.7	Ivan Goncharov; Russia	35:47.1	Sergiy Khyzhnyak; Ukraine	37:19.0
Individual	standing	Grygorii Vovchynskyi; Ukraine	39:03.2	Nils-Erik Ulset; Norway	39:08.6	Yannick Bourseaux; France	39:13.3
7.5 km	visually impaired	Nikolay Polukhin; Guide: Andrey Tokarev; Russia	21:09.9	Vasili Shaptsiaboi; Guide: Mikalai Shablouski; Belarus	21:40.8	Wilhelm Brem; Guide: Florian Grimm; Germany	21:59.1
7.5 km	sitting	Irek Zaripov; Russia	19:37.0	Kamil Rosiek; Poland	20:19.7	Roman Petushkov; Russia	20:41.9
7.5 km	standing	Kirill Mikhaylov; Russia	20:41.5	Nils-Erik Ulset; Norway	21:00.7	Oleg Balukhto; Russia	21:18.1

==== Women ====
Event	Class	Gold		Silver		Bronze	
Pursuit	visually impaired	Mikhalina Lysova; Guide: Alexey Ivanov; Russia	10:30.7	Oksana Shyshkova; Guide: Volodymyr Ivanov; Ukraine	11:35.5	Elena Remizova; Guide: Natalia Yakimova; Russia	11:52.1
Pursuit	sitting	Maria Iovleva; Russia	12:06.6	Olena Iurkovska; Ukraine	12:18.6	Andrea Eskau; Germany	13:44.4
Pursuit	standing	Anna Burmistrova; Russia	12:03.5	Katarzyna Rogowiec; Poland	12:08.2	Oleksandra Kononova; Ukraine	12:35.9
Individual	visually impaired	Mikhalina Lysova; Guide: Alexey Ivanov; Russia	50:21.3	Oksana Shyshkova; Guide: Volodymyr Ivanov; Ukraine	52:22.2	Tatiana Ilyuchenko; Guide: Valery Koshkin; Russia	53:10.1
Individual	sitting	Andrea Eskau; Germany	38:27.4	Olena Iurkovska; Ukraine	39:11.1	Lyudmyla Pavlenko; Ukraine	40:23.8
Individual	standing	Oleksandra Kononova; Ukraine	49:43.3	Katarzyna Rogowiec; Poland	49:56.7	Maija Loytynoja; Finland	50:06.4
7.5 km	visually impaired	Elena Remizova; Guide: Natalia Yakimova; Russia	26:35.0	Mikhalina Lysova; Guide: Alexey Ivanov; Russia	27:20.3	Tatiana Ilyuchenko; Guide: Valery Koshkin; Russia	27:25.1
7.5 km	sitting	Olena Iurkovska; Ukraine	23:02.3	Lyudmyla Pavlenko; Ukraine	23:45.2	Andrea Eskau; Germany	24:05.7
7.5 km	standing	Oleksandra Kononova; Ukraine	24:43.7	Katarzyna Rogowiec; Poland	25:35.6	Maija Loytynoja; Finland	26:34.7

=== Cross-country skiing ===
==== Men ====
Event	Class	Gold		Silver		Bronze	
Sprint	visually impaired	Brian McKeever; Guide: Erik Carleton; Canada	3:13.8	Nikolay Polukhin; Guide: Andrey Tokarev; Russia	3:18.2	Alexei Toropov; Guide: Sergey Maksimov; Russia	3:21.8
Sprint	sitting	Trygve Steinar Larsen; Norway	2:15.5	Chris Klebl; Canada	2:22.3	Irek Zaripov; Russia	2:29.1
Sprint	standing	Kirill Mikhaylov; Russia	3:10.7	Vegard Dahle; Norway	3:15.0	Vladimir Kononov; Russia	3:16.1
Middle distance	visually impaired	Brian McKeever; Guide: Erik Carleton; Canada	24:28.5	Nikolay Polukhin; Guide: Andrey Tokarev; Russia	25:14.3	Vasili Shaptsiaboi; Guide: Mikalai Shablouski; Belarus	25:48.5
Middle distance	sitting	Irek Zaripov; Russia	24:31.0	Enzo Masiello; Italy	24:42.9	Trygve Steinar Larsen; Norway	24:50.9
Middle distance	standing	Vladimir Kononov; Russia	25:05.6	Kirill Mikhaylov; Russia	25:33.9	Azat Karachurin; Russia	25:41.9
Long distance	visually impaired	Brian McKeever; Guide: Erik Carleton; Canada	53:26.7	Nikolay Polukhin; Guide: Andrey Tokarev; Russia	54:10.0	Alexei Toropov; Guide: Sergey Maksimov; Russia	58:42.2
Long distance	sitting	Chris Klebl; Canada	35:34.6	Irek Zaripov; Russia	35:43.6	Enzo Masiello; Italy	36:15.7
Long distance	standing	Kirill Mikhaylov; Russia	53:53.0	Vegard Dahle; Norway	56:01.2	Ilkka Tuomisto; Finland	57:22.5
Relay	open	Russia; Sergey Shilov, Kirill Mikhaylov, Nikolay Polukhin, Guide: Andrey Tokarev	42:11.7	Norway; Trygve Steinar Larsen, Vegard Dahle, Nils-Erik Ulset	42:21.9	Ukraine; Iurii Kostiuk, Grygorii Vovchynskyi, Vitaliy Lukyanenko, Guide: Dmytro Khurtyk	44:29.4

==== Women ====
Event	Class	Gold		Silver		Bronze	
Sprint	visually impaired	Mikhalina Lysova; Guide: Alexey Ivanov; Russia	3:25.5	Oksana Shyshkova; Guide: Volodymyr Ivanov; Ukraine	3:30.2	Tatiana Ilyuchenko; Guide: Valery Koshkin; Russia	3:35.3
Sprint	sitting	Andrea Eskau; Germany	2:39.1	Maria Iovleva; Russia	2:40.6	Mariann Marthinsen; Norway	2:45.4
Sprint	standing	Oleksandra Kononova; Ukraine	4:05.6	Katarzyna Rogowiec; Poland	4:09.8	Maija Loytynoja; Finland	4:09.9
Middle distance	visually impaired	Elena Remizova; Guide: Natalia Yakimova; Russia	14:31.5	Mikhalina Lysova; Guide: Alexey Ivanov; Russia	15:01.9	Tatiana Ilyuchenko; Guide: Valery Koshkin; Russia	15:25.2
Middle distance	sitting	Liudmila Vauchok; Belarus	13:48.0	Francesca Porcellato; Italy	13:57.3	Mariann Marthinsen; Norway	14:05.0
Middle distance	standing	Katarzyna Rogowiec; Poland	14:54.3	Oleksandra Kononova; Ukraine	14:56.2	Iuliia Batenkova; Ukraine	16:07.5
Long distance	visually impaired	Elena Remizova; Guide: Natalia Yakomova; Russia	47:44.1	Mikhalina Lysova; Guide: Alexey Ivanov; Russia	48:30.7	Tatiana Ilyuchenko; Guide: Valery Koshkin; Russia	50:44.1
Long distance	sitting	Colette Bourgonje; Canada	26:56.0	Liudmila Vauchok; Belarus	27:05.7	Andrea Eskau; Germany	27:49.6
Long distance	standing	Oleksandra Kononova; Ukraine	50:43.1	Iuliia Batenkova; Ukraine	52:08.3	Katarzyna Rogowiec; Poland	52:30.0
Relay	open	Russia; Maria Iovleva, Mikhalina Lysova, Guide: Alexey Ivanov, Elena Remizova, Guide: Natalia Yakimova	19:48.4	Ukraine; Olena Iurkovska, Oksana Shyshkova, Guide: Volodymyr Ivanov, Oleksandra Kononova	20:40.3	–	

== Classification ==
Standing

- LW2 - standing: single leg amputation above the knee
- LW3 - standing: double leg amputation below the knee, mild cerebral palsy, or equivalent impairment
- LW4 - standing: single leg amputation below the knee
- LW5/7 - standing: double arm amputation
- LW6/8 - standing: single arm amputation
- LW9 - standing: amputation or equivalent impairment of one arm and one leg

Sitting

- LW 10 - sitting: paraplegia with no or some upper abdominal function and no functional sitting balance
- LW 11 - sitting: paraplegia with fair functional sitting balance
- LW 12 - sitting: double leg amputation above the knees, or paraplegia with some leg function and good sitting balance

Visual impairment

- B1 - visually impaired: no functional vision
- B2 - visually impaired: up to ca 3-5% functional vision
- B3 - visually impaired: under 10% functional vision

Skiers with a visual impairment compete with a sighted guide. The skier with the visual impairment and the guide are considered a team, and dual medals are awarded.

=== Calculated time ===
A percentage system is used to calculate the final time of each skier. Each skiers finishing time, is multiplied with a percentage factor, to determine a final, calculated time.

Within each category (sitting, standing, visual impairment) there are skiers with various classifications (for example B1, B2 and B3 in the visual impairment category). There are different percentage factors for each classification.

Class	Percentage (factor)	
Class	Classic	Free technique
Visual impairment
B1	87%	85%
B2	98%	98%
B3	100%	100%
Standing
LW2	91-93%*	86 – 91%*
LW3	87-94%*	80 – 96%*
LW4	96%	96%
LW5/7	79%	87%
LW6	91%	96%
LW8	92%	97%
LW9	85 – 95%*	82 – 96%*
Sitting
LW10	86%	
LW10,5	91%	
LW11	94%	
LW11,5	98%	
LW12	100%	

== Participating nations ==
13 countries competed.

- Austria
- Belarus
- Canada
- Finland
- France
- Germany
- Italy
- Norway
- Poland
- Russia
- Sweden
- Ukraine
- United States

== Medal table ==
Medal winners by nation.

* Host nation (Russia)

Rank	Nation	Gold	Silver	Bronze	Total
1	Russia (RUS)*	20	13	15	48
2	Ukraine (UKR)	8	9	6	23
3	Canada (CAN)	5	2	0	7
4	Germany (GER)	2	0	4	6
5	Norway (NOR)	1	5	3	9
6	Poland (POL)	1	5	1	7
7	Belarus (BLR)	1	2	2	5
8	Italy (ITA)	0	2	1	3
9	Finland (FIN)	0	0	4	4
10	France (FRA)	0	0	1	1
Totals (10 entries)		38	38	37	113

== See also ==
- FIS Nordic World Ski Championships 2011
- Biathlon World Championships 2011
