= Biathlon World Championships 2011 – Men's pursuit =

Men's pursuit at the Biathlon World Championships 2011
- Location: Khanty-Mansiysk, Russia
- Date: 6 March
- Competitors: 60 from 23 nations
- Winning time: 33:02.6

Medalists
gold medal	Martin Fourcade	France
silver medal	Emil Hegle Svendsen	Norway
bronze medal	Tarjei Bø	Norway

The men's pursuit competition of the Biathlon World Championships 2011 was held on March 6, 2011 at 14:00 local time. The best 60 athletes from the sprint participated.

== Results ==
Rank	Bib	Name	Country	Start	Penalties (P+P+S+S)	Time	Deficit
1st place, gold medalist(s)	2	Martin Fourcade	France	0:13	3 (0+1+2+0)	33:02.6	
2nd place, silver medalist(s)	5	Emil Hegle Svendsen	Norway	0:30	2 (0+0+1+1)	33:06.4	+3.8
3rd place, bronze medalist(s)	3	Tarjei Bø	Norway	0:25	2 (0+0+1+1)	33:07.8	+5.2
4	1	Arnd Peiffer	Germany	0:00	2 (0+0+1+1)	33:08.4	+5.8
5	6	Andreas Birnbacher	Germany	0:32	2 (0+0+1+1)	34:06.6	+1:04.0
6	13	Simon Fourcade	France	0:59	1 (0+0+1+0)	34:26.3	+1:23.7
7	10	Andriy Deryzemlya	Ukraine	0:55	2 (0+0+1+1)	34:32.9	+1:30.3
8	12	Michal Šlesingr	Czech Republic	0:59	4 (2+0+2+0)	34:37.6	+1:35.0
9	16	Lukas Hofer	Italy	1:04	4 (0+3+0+1)	34:39.5	+1:36.9
10	23	Björn Ferry	Sweden	1:22	3 (1+0+1+1)	34:39.6	+1:37.0
11	9	Michael Greis	Germany	0:53	3 (0+1+2+0)	34:40.7	+1:38.1
12	29	Evgeny Ustyugov	Russia	1:38	2 (0+0+1+1)	34:43.5	+1:40.9
13	18	Markus Windisch	Italy	1:11	2 (0+0+1+1)	34:45.9	+1:43.3
14	17	Simon Eder	Austria	1:05	3 (1+0+1+1)	34:46.6	+1:44.0
15	28	Serhiy Semenov	Ukraine	1:37	2 (0+1+1+0)	34:54.0	+1:51.4
16	7	Christoph Stephan	Germany	0:35	4 (1+0+3+0)	34:56.4	+1:53.8
17	4	Andrei Makoveev	Russia	0:30	4 (2+0+1+1)	34:56.8	+1:54.2
18	19	Ivan Tcherezov	Russia	1:16	4 (1+0+2+1)	35:15.6	+2:13.0
19	14	Lars Berger	Norway	1:04	5 (1+0+1+3)	35:26.8	+2:24.2
20	8	Edgars Piksons	Latvia	0:43	5 (2+2+1+0)	35:29.3	+2:26.7
21	37	Anton Shipulin	Russia	2:03	2 (0+0+2+0)	35:31.6	+2:29.0
22	27	Christoph Sumann	Austria	1:29	5 (0+2+1+2)	35:32.3	+2:29.7
23	21	Christian de Lorenzi	Italy	1:21	4 (1+1+0+2)	35:34.4	+2:31.8
24	22	Ole Einar Bjørndalen	Norway	1:22	5 (1+2+0+2)	35:41.3	+2:38.7
25	11	Fredrik Lindström	Sweden	0:58	5 (0+1+1+3)	35:50.1	+2:47.5
26	38	Daniel Mesotitsch	Austria	2:05	2 (0+0+2+0)	35:54.4	+2:51.8
27	33	Serguei Sednev	Ukraine	1:52	2 (0+0+0+2)	36:06.2	+3:03.6
28	47	Carl Johan Bergman	Sweden	2:22	3 (0+1+0+2)	36:06.9	+3:04.3
29	24	Simon Hallenbarter	Switzerland	1:25	5 (1+2+1+1)	36:12.0	+3:09.4
30	31	Tim Burke	United States	1:41	6 (2+0+3+1)	36:12.6	+3:10.0
31	34	Scott Perras	Canada	1:56	3 (1+1+1+0)	36:14.1	+3:11.5
32	51	Magnus Jonsson	Sweden	2:31	2 (0+1+1+0)	36:16.6	+3:14.0
33	52	Benjamin Weger	Switzerland	2:34	2 (0+0+1+1)	36:21.0	+3:18.4
34	15	Klemen Bauer	Slovenia	1:04	8 (0+3+3+2)	36:24.5	+3:21.9
35	42	Jay Hakkinen	United States	2:16	2 (0+1+0+1)	36:25.6	+3:23.0
36	20	Ilmārs Bricis	Latvia	1:16	5 (2+0+1+2)	36:38.2	+3:35.6
37	43	Indrek Tobreluts	Estonia	2:17	2 (0+1+0+1)	36:40.2	+3:37.6
38	26	Leif Nordgren	United States	1:29	6 (1+2+2+1)	36:47.2	+3:44.6
39	40	Zdeněk Vítek	Czech Republic	2:06	3 (0+1+0+2)	36:48.8	+3:46.2
40	50	Michail Kletcherov	Bulgaria	2:28	3 (1+0+1+1)	36:50.7	+3:48.1
41	36	Paavo Puurunen	Finland	2:03	4 (0+2+1+1)	36:51.1	+3:48.5
42	25	Olexander Bilanenko	Ukraine	1:27	5 (1+1+0+3)	37:03.1	+4:00.5
43	39	Timo Antila	Finland	2:05	3 (1+0+1+1)	37:04.5	+4:01.9
44	58	Jarkko Kauppinen	Finland	2:44	1 (0+0+0+1)	37:08.7	+4:06.1
45	32	Lowell Bailey	United States	1:42	6 (0+0+3+3)	37:10.0	+4:07.4
46	49	Dominik Landertinger	Austria	2:27	5 (2+0+2+1)	37:30.4	+4:27.8
47	48	Lee-Steve Jackson	Great Britain	2:25	3 (0+0+2+1)	37:44.8	+4:42.2
48	30	Alexsandr Chervyhkov	Kazakhstan	1:41	6 (1+1+2+2)	37:50.0	+4:47.4
49	41	Janez Marič	Slovenia	2:06	5 (1+1+2+1)	38:01.1	+4:58.5
50	53	Rene Laurent Vuillermoz	Italy	2:34	6 (0+2+4+0)	38:04.9	+5:02.3
51	35	Matthias Simmen	Switzerland	1:59	7 (2+1+2+2)	38:09.3	+5:06.7
52	46	Jean-Philippe Leguellec	Canada	2:19	4 (1+1+1+1)	38:12.2	+5:09.6
53	56	Vasja Rupnik	Slovenia	2:37	7 (1+2+2+2)	38:33.0	+5:30.4
54	55	Junji Nagai	Japan	2:36	5 (1+1+3+0)	38:36.1	+5:33.5
55	44	Ren Long	China	2:18	5 (2+1+0+2)	38:58.6	+5:56.0
56	45	Vincent Jay	France	2:19	4 (1+0+2+1)	39:21.3	+6:18.7
57	54	Hidenori Isa	Japan	2:35	5 (2+0+1+2)	39:21.5	+6:18.9
58	59	Vladimir Chepelin	Belarus	2:48	6 (2+0+2+2)	39:52.3	+6:49.7
59	60	Tomas Kaukėnas	Lithuania	2:48	7 (0+2+2+3)	40:14.0	+7:11.4
	57	Marcel Laponder	Great Britain	2:39	6 (1+2+1+2)	LAP	

== See also ==
- 2011 IPC Biathlon and Cross-Country Skiing World Championships – Men's pursuit
