= Chris Klebl =

American-Canadian cross-country skier (born 1972)

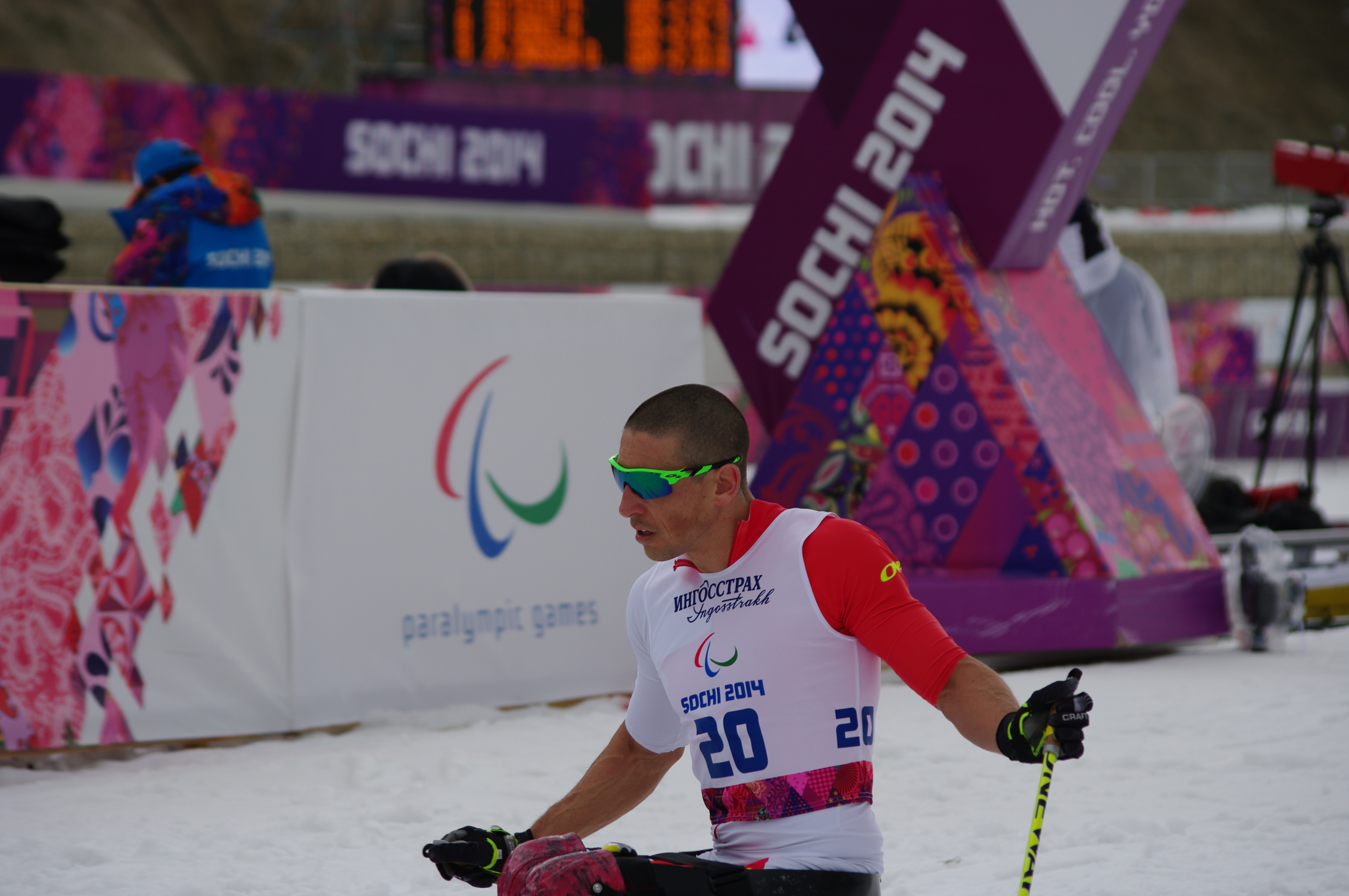
- Klebl in 2014

Personal information
- Full name: Christopher Klebl
- Born: 5 January 1972 (age 54) Düsseldorf, Germany
- Height: 1.85 m (6 ft 1 in)
Medal record
Men's para cross-country skiing
Representing Canada
Paralympic Games
| Gold medal – first place | 2014 Sochi | 10 km sitting |
| Silver medal – second place | 2018 Pyeongchang | 4 x 2.5 km mixed relay |
World Championships
| Gold medal – first place | 2011 Khanty-Mansiysk | 15 km sitting |
| Silver medal – second place | 2011 Khanty-Mansiysk | Sprint sitting |

Christopher Klebl (born 5 January 1972) is an American-Canadian cross-country skier who represented the United States at the 2006 and 2010 Winter Paralympics before winning a gold medal for Canada at the 2014 Winter Paralympics.

== Personal life ==
Klebl was born in Düsseldorf, Germany as an American citizen. He grew up in Austria and moved to the United States in 1987. In 1995 he suffered back injury during a snowboarding accident that left him paralysed below the waist. He worked as a massage therapist in Kauai, Hawaii and then in the software industry in California before moving back to Colorado and taking up sit-skiing.

He has a degree in economics from Syracuse University.

== Career ==
Klebl competes in the LW11 para-Nordic skiing classification using a two ski sit-ski and was introduced to the sport by Monica Bascio.

He began competing for the US para-Nordic skiing team and represented them at the 2005 IPC Nordic Skiing World Championships held in Fort Kent, Maine, United States where he finished 17th in the 10 km and 18th in the 5 km.

Kebl was selected for the United States team for the 2006 Winter Paralympics in Turin, Italy. In the men's 1 × 3.75 km + 2 × 5 km relay he finished sixth alongside teammates Steve Cook and Michael Crenshaw. In the individual events he finished 23rd in the 5 km, 18th in the 10 km, and 11th in the 15 km.

Between 2007 and 2008 he won 11 medals at IPC World Cup events. At the 2009 World championships in Vuokatti, Finland he finished 4th in the 15 km, 6th in the 10 km and 7th in the sprint.

At the 2010 Winter Paralympics in Vancouver, Canada he was again selected for the United States team. In the 1 km sprint he finished ninth in the qualification round and was eliminated. In the 10 km he finished 16th and in the 15 km he finished 8th.

In 2011 he moved to Canmore, Alberta and joined the Canadian national team in time for the 2011 IPC Biathlon and Cross-Country Skiing World Championships in Khanty-Mansiysk, Russia. He won a silver medal in the sprint finishing behind Trygve Steinar Larsen of Norway. In the 15 km race he finished in a time of 35 minutes 34.6 seconds to win the gold medal.

Klebl competed in his third Paralympics at the 2014 Games in Sochi, Russia, representing the Canadian team. He finished 6th in the 15 km, 8th in the 1 km sprint and partnered Brian McKeever to 4th position in the 4 x 2.5 km relay. In the 10 km event Klebl won his first Paralympic medal, taking gold in a time of 30 minutes 52 seconds. In doing so he prevented Russia's Roman Petushkov from winning a record equalling seventh gold medal at a single Paralympics.
