= Helge Flo =

Norwegian cross-country skier

Personal information
- Born: 17 December 1966 (age 59)

Sport
- Sport: Para cross-country skiing
Medal record
Representing Norway
Paralympic Games
Gold medal – first place	2002 Salt Lake City	5km B1
Silver medal – second place	2010 Vancouver	10km visually impaired
Bronze medal – third place	1998 Nagano	5km B1
Bronze medal – third place	2006 Torino	5km visually impaired

Helge Flo (born December 17, 1966) is a visually impaired Norwegian cross-country skier competing at the 1998, 2002, 2006 and 2010 Winter Paralympics.
