= Ilkka Tuomisto =

Finnish Para cross-country skier and biathlete (born 1984)

Personal information
- Nationality: Finnish
- Born: 19 January 1984 (age 42) Hämeenkyrö, Finland
- Height: 1.77 m (5 ft 10 in)
- Weight: 65 kg (143 lb)

Sport
- Country: Finland
- Sport: Para Nordic skiing (Para cross-country skiing and Para biathlon)
- Disability class: LW6/8
- Coached by: Toni Myllylä
Medal record
Men's Para cross-country skiing
Representing Finland
Paralympic Games
Silver medal – second place	2014 Sochi	20km classic style standing
Bronze medal – third place	2010 Vancouver	1km sprint classic standing
Bronze medal – third place	2018 PyeongChang	1.5km sprint classic standing

Ilkka Tuomisto (born 19 January 1984) is a Finnish male Para cross-country skier and biathlete. He has represented Finland at the Paralympics in 2010 and 2014 claiming two medals in his Paralympic career.

== Biography ==
Tuomisto was born on 19 January 1984 with his left arm got amputated at his birth. He received his first prosthetic arm at the age of five. He took the sport of skiing at the age of 18.

== Career ==
Tuomisto made his first appearance at the Winter Paralympics in 2010 and managed to claim a bronze medal in the men's 1 km Sprint Classic standing category. He was also the flagbearer for Finland at the 2010 Winter Paralympics during the opening ceremony of the multi-sport event.

He also took part in the 2014 Winter Paralympics and clinched a silver medal in the men's classic style standing category.

He is qualified to compete at the 2018 Winter Paralympics and took a bronze medal in the men's 1.5 km Sprint Classic standing category.
