= Martin Fleig =

German Paralympic cross-country skier and biathlete

Personal information
- Nationality: German
- Born: 15 October 1989 (age 37) Freiburg im Breisgau, West Germany
- Website: www.martin-fleig.de

Sport
- Country: Germany
- Disability class: LW11
Medal record
Men's para biathlon
Representing Germany
Winter Paralympics
Gold medal – first place	2018 Pyeongchang	15km sitting
Silver medal – second place	2022 Beijing	10km sitting

Martin Fleig (born 15 October 1989) is a German male Paralympic cross-country skier and biathlete.

== Career ==
He made his Paralympic debut during the 2014 Winter Paralympics which was held in Sochi, Russia. Martin went onto compete at the 2018 Winter Paralympics, his second consecutive Winter Paralympic event and claimed his first Paralympic medal in the biathlon event.

Martin Fleig clinched a gold medal in the men's 15km sitting event during the 2018 Winter Paralympics.
