= Wilhelm Brem =

Paralympic biathlete of Germany

Personal information
- Nickname: Willi
- Nationality: German
- Born: 23 November 1977 (age 48) Buchloe, Bavaria, West Germany
- Occupation(s): Physiotherapist, athlete

Sport
- Country: Germany
- Sport: Nordic skiing
- Disability: Vision impairment
- Disability class: B1
- Team: Ring der Korperbehinderten

Achievements and titles
- Paralympic finals: 1994, 1998, 2002, 2006, 2010, 2014
Medal record
Men's Nordic skiing
Representing Germany
Event	1st	2nd	3rd
Paralympic Games	3	3	2
IPC World Championships	1	–	2
Total	4	3	4

Wilhelm Brem (born 23 November 1977) is a Paralympic biathlete and cross-country skier representing Germany in the Winter Paralympics and the IPC World Championships. He often skis with Florian Grimm as his guide. As of the 2014 Winter Paralympics in Sochi, Brem has won 4 gold, 3 silver, and 4 bronze medals between the Paralympics games and the IPC World Championships. Brem was awarded the Silver Laurel Leaf in 2010, the highest athletic award in Germany. He was the German flag bearer during the closing ceremony of the 2014 Paralympics in Sochi.

Brem began losing his sight at eight years old; by fourteen, he was fully blind. He has been para-Nordic skiing since he was 16.

== Results ==
Representing Germany
Year	Competition	Venue	Position	Event
1994	Winter Paralympics	Lillehammer, Norway	2nd	Biathlon, 7.5 km
1994	Winter Paralympics	Lillehammer, Norway	9th	10 km
1994	Winter Paralympics	Lillehammer, Norway	11th	5 km
1994	Winter Paralympics	Lillehammer, Norway	13th	15 km
1998	Winter Paralympics	Nagano, Japan	1st	Biathlon, 7.5 km
1998	Winter Paralympics	Nagano, Japan	2nd	Cross country, 15 km freestyle
1998	Winter Paralympics	Nagano, Japan	6th	Cross country, 5 km classic
1998	Winter Paralympics	Nagano, Japan	7th	Cross country, 20 km classic
1998	Winter Paralympics	Nagano, Japan	2nd	Cross Country, 4 x 5 km Relay
2002	Winter Paralympics	Salt Lake City, Utah, USA	1st	Biathlon, 7.5 km
2002	Winter Paralympics	Salt Lake City, Utah, USA	DNF	Cross country, 5 km classic
2002	Winter Paralympics	Salt Lake City, Utah, USA	3rd	Cross country, 10 km freestyle
2002	Winter Paralympics	Salt Lake City, Utah, USA	10th	Cross country, 20 km freestyle
2003	World Championships	Baiersbronn, Germany	3rd	Biathlon, 7.5 km
2003	World Championships	Baiersbronn, Germany	4th	Biathlon, 12.5 km
2003	World Championships	Baiersbronn, Germany	6th	Cross Country, 20 km
2003	World Championships	Baiersbronn, Germany	6th	Cross Country, relay
2003	World Championships	Baiersbronn, Germany	7th	Cross Country, 10 km
2003	World Championships	Baiersbronn, Germany	9th	5 km
2006	Winter Paralympics	Turin, Italy	3rd	Biathlon, 12.5 km
2006	Winter Paralympics	Turin, Italy	5th	Biathlon, 7.5 km sprint
2006	Winter Paralympics	Turin, Italy	4th	Cross country, 5 km
2006	Winter Paralympics	Turin, Italy	DNS	Cross country, 10 km
2006	Winter Paralympics	Turin, Italy	5th	Cross country, 20 km
2006	Winter Paralympics	Turin, Italy	4th	Cross country, 1 x 3.75 + 2 x 5 km relay
2007	IPC World Championships	Baiersbronn, Germany	1st	Biathlon
2010	Winter Paralympics	Vancouver, Canada	1st	Biathlon, 12.5 km
2010	Winter Paralympics	Vancouver, Canada	4th	Biathlon, 3 km pursuit
2010	Winter Paralympics	Vancouver, Canada	4th	Cross country, 20 km freestyle
2010	Winter Paralympics	Vancouver, Canada	7th	Cross country, 1 km sprint classic
2013	IPC Nordic Skiing World Championships	Sollefteå, Sweden	3rd	Cross country, relay
2013	IPC Nordic Skiing World Championships	Sollefteå, Sweden	4th	7.5 km
2014	Winter Paralympics	Sochi, Russia	7th	Biathlon, 7.5 km sprint
2014	Winter Paralympics	Sochi, Russia	DNS	Biathlon, 12.5 km middle
2014	Winter Paralympics	Sochi, Russia	9th	Biathlon, 15 km
2014	Winter Paralympics	Sochi, Russia	5th	Cross country, 4 x 2.5 km relay mixed
