= Iurii Utkin =

Ukrainian Paralympic athlete (born 1990)

Personal information
- Nationality: Ukrainian
- Born: 3 August 1990 (age 35) Kharkiv, Ukraine

Sport
- Country: Ukraine
- Disability class: B2
- Partner: Ruslan Perekhoda (guide)
Medal record
Representing Ukraine
Men's Paralympic cross-country skiing
Winter Paralympics
Silver medal – second place	Sochi 2014	4 x 2.5 km relay open
Men's Paralympic biathlon
Bronze medal – third place	Pyeongchang 2018	Paralympic Champion 2018 12.5km visually impaired

Iurii Utkin (Ukrainian: Юрій Володимирович Уткін; born 3 August 1990) is a Ukrainian visually impaired cross-country skier and biathlete. He represented Ukraine at the Paralympics in 2010, 2014 and 2018.

== Career ==
Iurii made his Paralympic debut during the 2010 Winter Paralympics and went medalless at the event. He clinched his first Paralympic medal, a silver medal in the 4 x 2.5 km relay open event at the 2014 Winter Paralympics.

=== Paralympic Champion (Korea 2018) ===
He also claimed a bronze medal in the men's 12.5km visually impaired biathlon event as a part of the 2018 Winter Paralympics with the assistance of his sighted guide, Ruslan Perekhoda.
