= Enzo Masiello =

Italian Para athlete, cross-country skier and biathlete (born 1969)

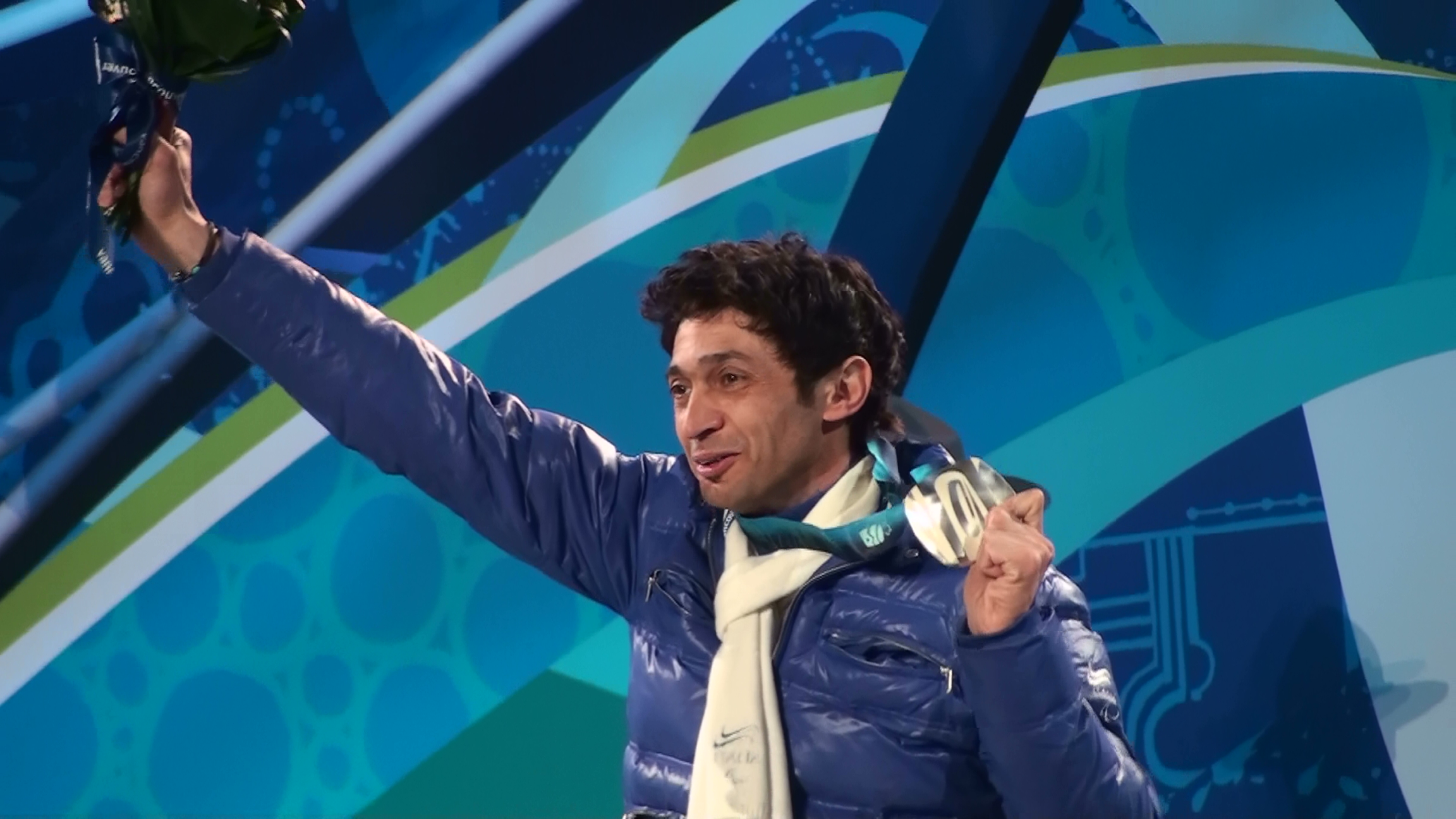
- Masiello claims silver medal in the men's 10km sitting event during the 2010 Vancouver Paralympics representing Italy

Personal information
- Nationality: Italian
- Born: 5 March 1969 (age 57) Matera, Italy

Sport
- Country: Italy
- Sport: Para athletics, Para Nordic skiing (Para cross-country and biathlon)
- Disability class: LW11
- Coached by: Alessandro Gamper
Medal record
Representing Italy
Men's Para cross-country skiing
Winter Paralympics
Silver medal – second place	2010 Vancouver	10km classic style sitting
Bronze medal – third place	2010 Vancouver	15km sitting
Men's Para athletics
Summer Paralympics
Bronze medal – third place	1992 Barcelona	5000m TW3–4

Enzo Masiello (born 5 March 1969) is an Italian Para cross-country skier and biathlete who also formerly competed in Para athletics at the Summer Paralympics. He has competed at the Paralympics in 6 occasions representing Italy both at the Summer Paralympics (1992, 1996 and 2000) and at the Winter Paralympics (2006, 2010 and 2014). Enzo is also the first Italian male athlete to win a medal both at the Summer Paralympics and in the Winter Paralympics. He was a recipient of the Order of Merit of the Italian Republic, which is one of the highest honours to be given in the nation.

== Biography ==
Enzo Masiello confronted with paraplegia following a traffic accident at the age of 18 which persuaded him to take the sport of wheelchair athletics.

== Career ==
After the tragic accident he faced during his teenage, he took the sport of Paralympic athletics and started to compete in 1990 before switching to skiing in 2004 following his success at the Para athletics. He decided to compete in skiing as a new challenge and got the opportunity to represent Italy at the 2006 Winter Paralympics after ending his Summer Paralympics career in 2000.

=== Summer Paralympics ===
He made his first Paralympic appearance for Italy at the 1992 Summer Paralympics and was successful in his maiden Summer Paralympic event after claiming a bronze medal in the men's 5000m category, which is also his only medal at the Paralympic athletics. He also went onto compete at the 1996 Summer Paralympics and in the 2000 Summer Paralympics but went medalless in both of the multi-sport events.

=== Winter Paralympics ===
After representing Italy at the Summer Paralympics in 3 previous editions, he switched to participate at the Winter Paralympics and qualified to compete with the 2006 Winter Paralympics, where he couldn't claim any medal in his maiden Winter Paralympics event. Enzo Masiello managed to clinch his first Winter Paralympic medals (a silver and a bronze medal) at the 2010 Winter Paralympics. He was the flagbearer for Italy at the closing ceremony during the 2010 Winter Paralympics.
