= Andrey Tokarev =

Russian cross country skier

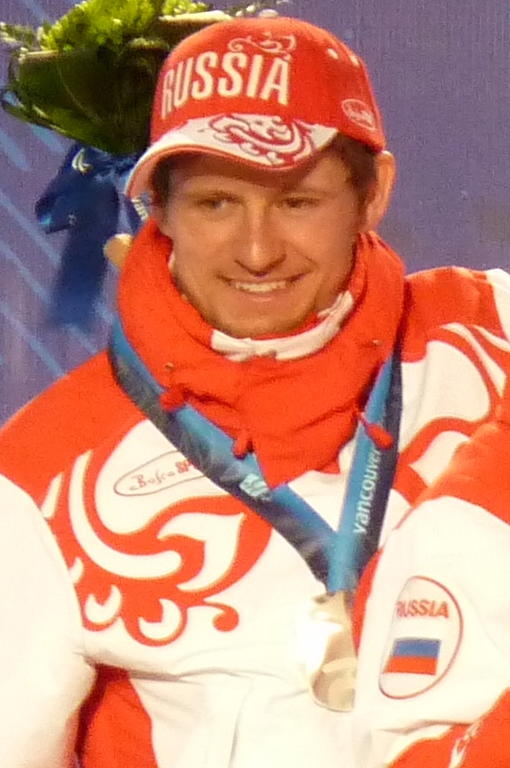

Personal information
- Born: Russia

Sport
- Sport: Skiing
Medal record
Representing Russia
Paralympic Games
Men's cross country skiing
Gold medal – first place	2010 Vancouver	1x4/2x5 km relay
Silver medal – second place	2010 Vancouver	1 km sprint
Silver medal – second place	2010 Vancouver	20 km
Bronze medal – third place	2010 Vancouver	10 km
Men's biathlon
Silver medal – second place	2010 Vancouver	12.5 km
Silver medal – second place	2010 Vancouver	3 km pursuit

Andrey Tokarev is a Russian cross country skier, biathlete, sighted guide and Paralympic Champion.

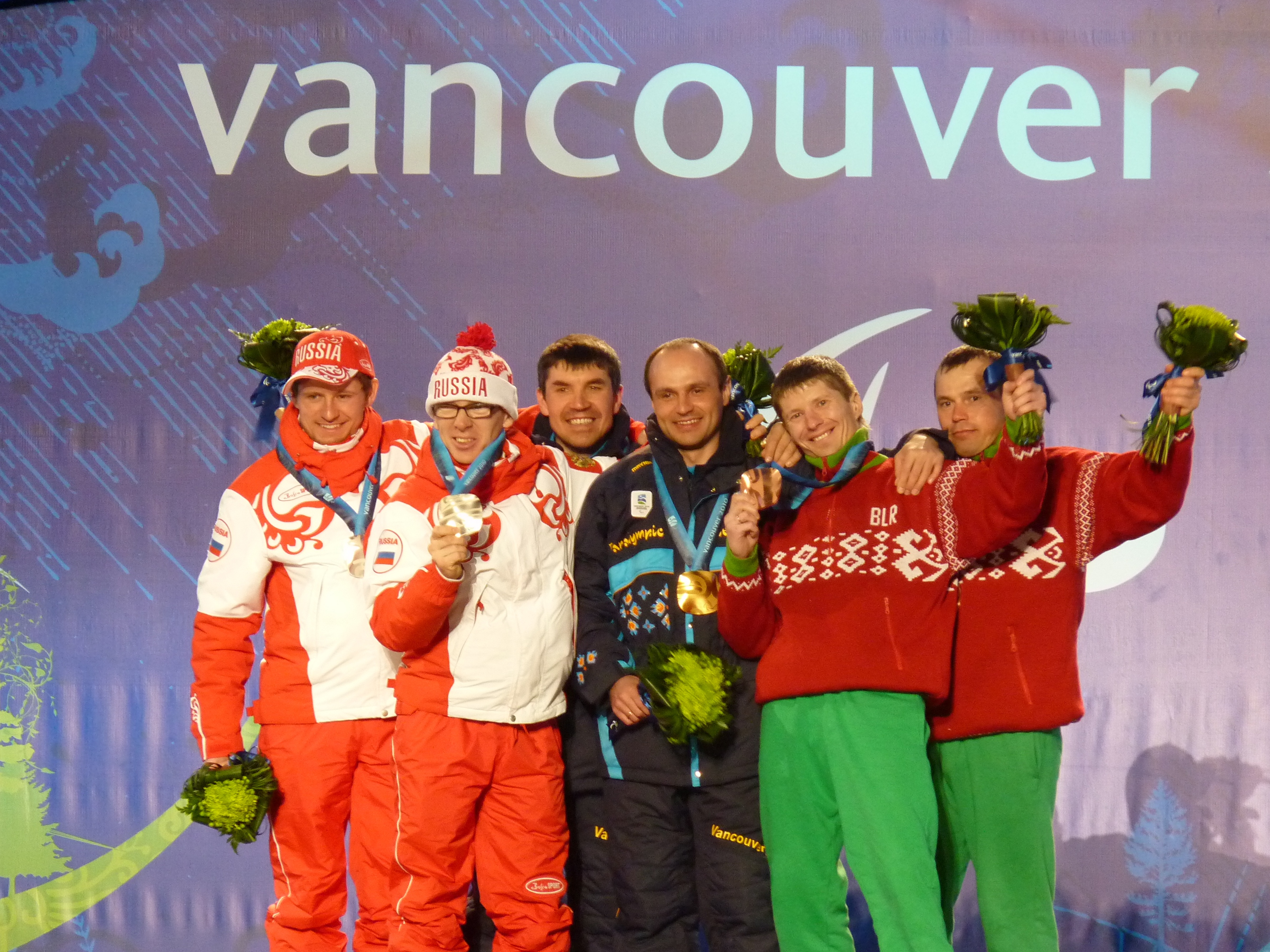
From left to right: Andrey Tokarev (guide) and Nikolay Polukhin of Russia (silver), Volodymyr Ivanov (guide) and Vitaliy Lukyanenko of Ukraine (gold), and Vasili Shaptsiabol and his guide Mikalai Shablouski of Belarus (bronze).

He was awarded the Order of Honour by Russian president Dmitry Medvedev in 2010.

One of his most notable achievements is winning the most medals at the Vancouver 2010 Winter Paralympics, with six medals, including one gold, as the sighted guide for Nikolay Polukhin at the 2010 Paralympic Winter Games in Vancouver.
