= Nikolay Polukhin =

Russian Paralympic

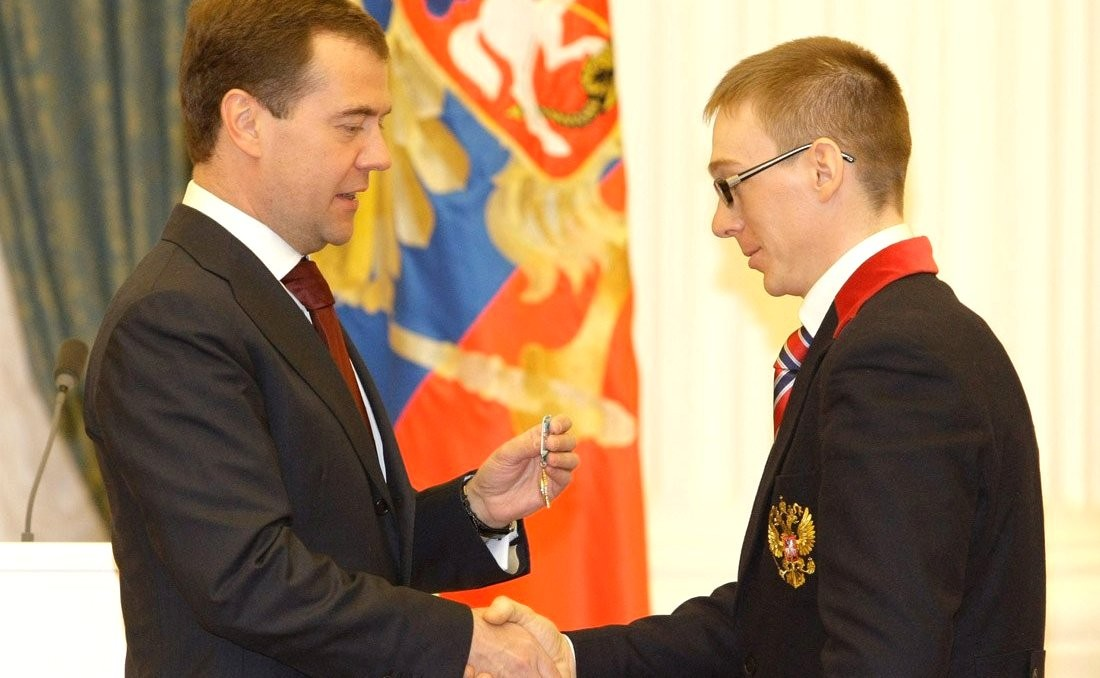
- Polukhin (right) is awarded the Order of Friendship by Russian president Dmitry Medvedev in 2010.

Personal information
- Full name: Nikolay Polukhin
- Born: 7 July 1982 (age 44) Russia

Sport
- Sport: Skiing
Medal record
Representing Russia
Paralympic Games
Men's cross country skiing
| Gold medal – first place | 2010 Vancouver | 1x4/2x5 km relay |
| Silver medal – second place | 2010 Vancouver | 1 km sprint |
| Silver medal – second place | 2010 Vancouver | 20 km |
| Bronze medal – third place | 2010 Vancouver | 10 km |
Men's biathlon
| Silver medal – second place | 2010 Vancouver | 12.5 km |
| Silver medal – second place | 2010 Vancouver | 3 km pursuit |

Nikolay Polukhin (born 7 July 1982) is a Russian cross-country skier, biathlete and Paralympic Champion. He is notable for winning the most medals at the Vancouver 2010 Winter Paralympics, with six medals, including one gold.

Polukhin was blinded in 1993 in an electrical accident. His sighted guide at Vancouver 2010 was Andrey Tokarev.
