= Kamil Rosiek =

Polish biathlete and cross-country skier

Kamil Rosiek (born 6 April 1984) is a biathlete and cross-country skier who has represented Poland at several Winter Paralympic Games. He served as their flag-bearer at the 2018 Winter Paralympics Parade of Nations.
