= Sergey Maksimov =

Russian ethnographic writer (1831–1901)

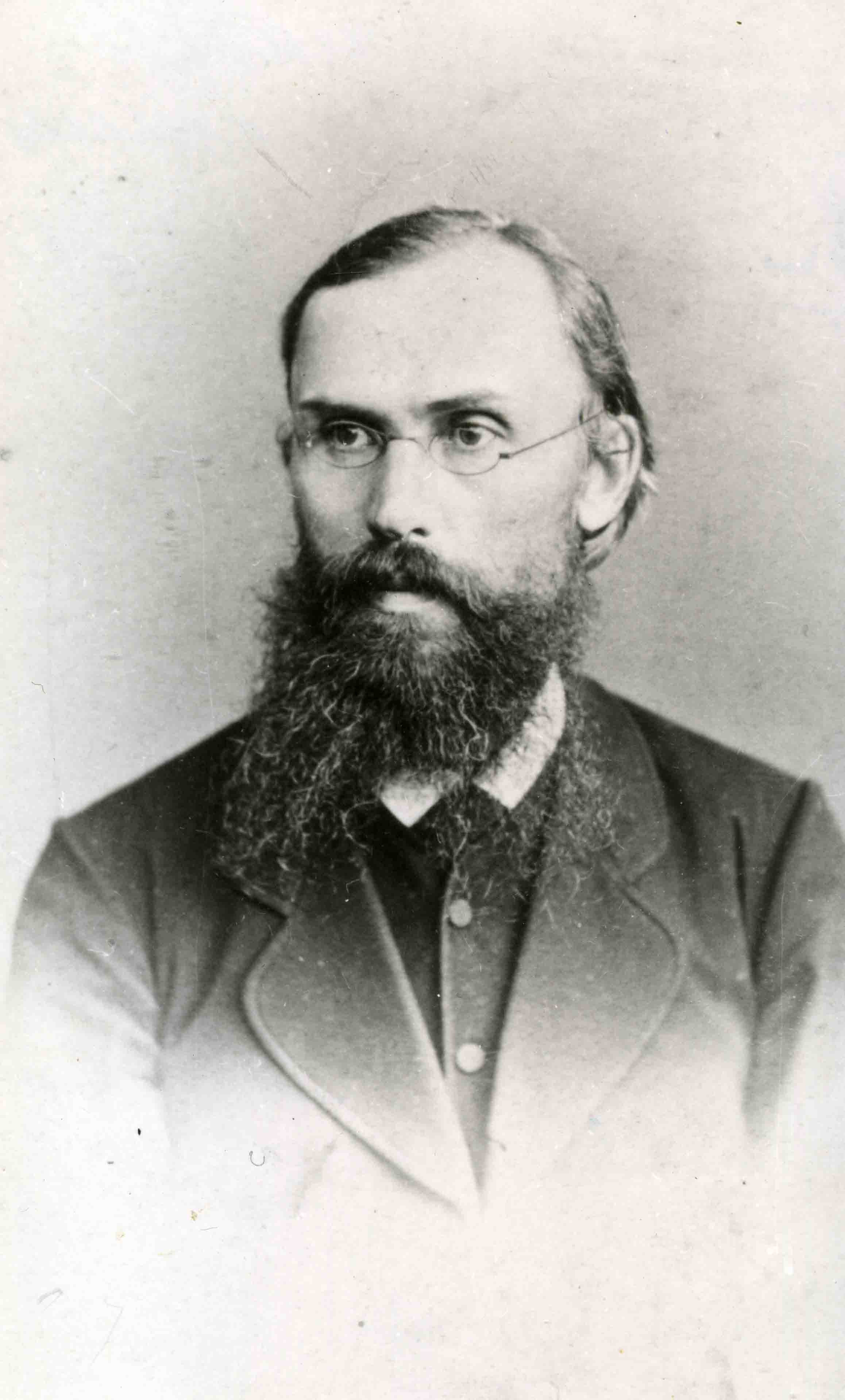
Sergey V. Maksimov

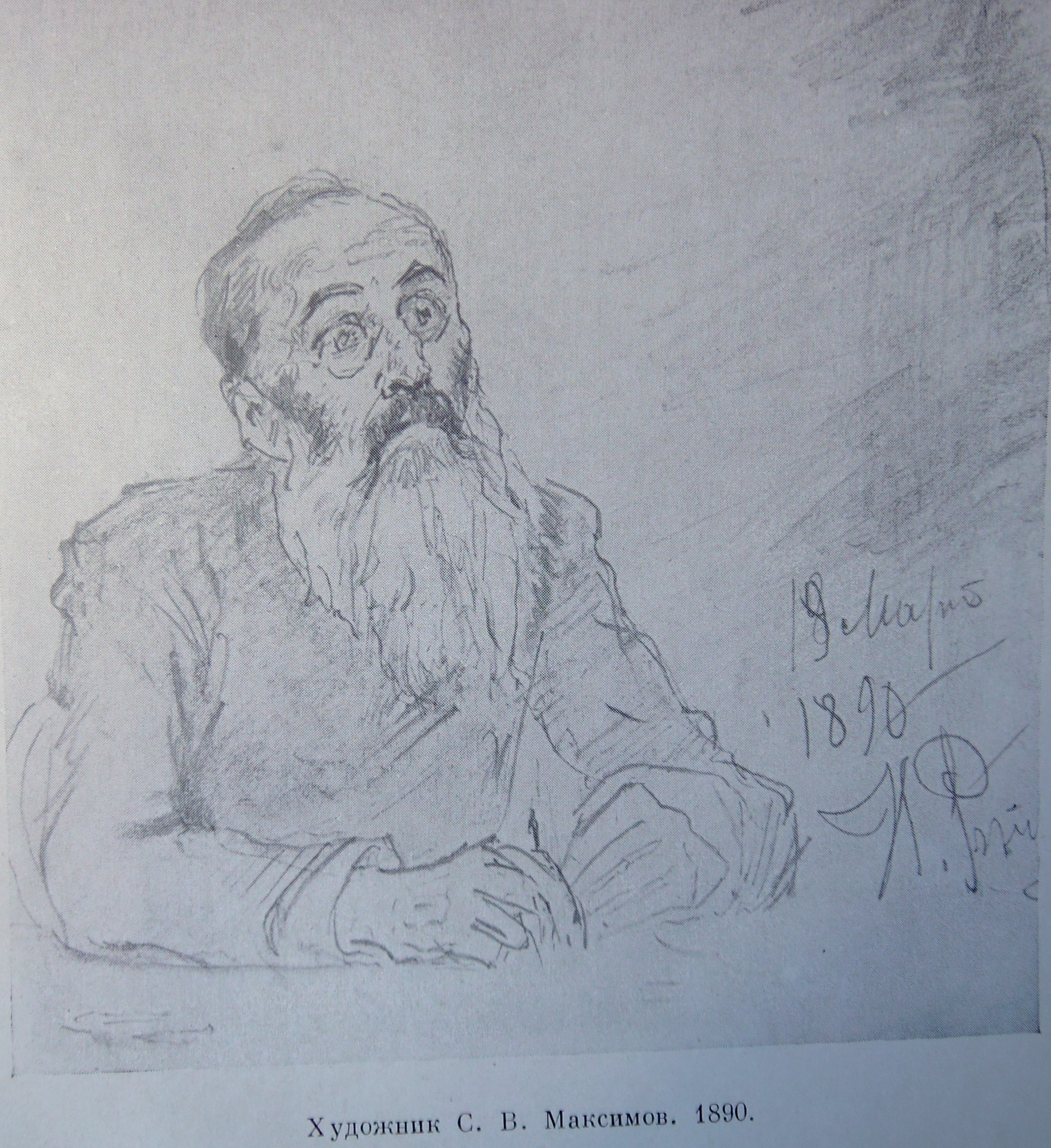
Repin's sketch, 1890

Sergey Vasilievich Maksimov (Серге́й Васи́льевич Макси́мов; October 7, 1831, Parfenyevo, Kologrivsky Uyezd, Kostroma Governorate – June 16, 1901, St. Petersburg) was a Russian traveler and ethnographic writer. In his works, based on his extensive travels across Imperial Russia, he gathered a wealth of detail about traditional life in rural communities.

Born into a family of petty nobility, Maksimov entered the medical faculty of Imperial Moscow University in 1850 and later studied at the Imperial Academy of Medical Surgery in St. Petersburg (1852–1856).

Maksimov made his literary debut with the ethnographic sketch Peasant Gatherings in the Kostroma Province (1854). Between 1855 and 1868, much like Vladimir Dal before him, he undertook six major expeditions throughout Russia. His impressions from these travels found expression in such works as A Year in the North (1859, about the Russian North and Pomors), In the East: A Journey to the Amur (1864), The Forest Wilderness: Scenes of Folk Life (1870), Siberia and the Katorga (1871, a pioneering overview of Siberian penal settlements), The Wandering Russia of the Christ’s Sake Beggars (1877, about the phenomenon of Russian wandering), and The Unclean Force (1899, devoted to folk demonology). According to the Great Russian Encyclopedia:

Maksimov was among the first to turn his attention systematically to the study and depiction of provincial Russian life, anticipating the broader cultural and literary fascination with this world that would emerge in the 1870s. His prose, illuminating many facets of both the spiritual and material culture of the Russian people, explored themes such as the everyday life of the central provinces, the crafts and trades of Russia’s remote regions, the customs of Old Believer communities, popular beliefs, omens, and superstitions, as well as Siberian penal life, wandering pilgrims, and beggary. His creative method — an original blend of ethnographic narrative, domestic sketch, and travel writing — gave his books an almost encyclopedic breadth and documentary richness.

Maksimov also wrote works intended for popular readership, including The Land of the Baptized Light (4 volumes, 1865–1866), devoted to the lives of Russia's indigenous peoples. His Winged Words (1890) provided explanations of many Russian idioms and proverbial expressions. He was a close friend of the writers Aleksey Pisemsky and Alexander Ostrovsky, and Mikhail Saltykov-Shchedrin once remarked that Maksimov's stories "ought to be a constant companion to anyone who seeks to understand the Russian national character."

In 1900, Maksimov was elected an honorary member of the St. Petersburg Academy of Sciences. The materials he collected were widely used by notable writers (such as Nikolay Nekrasov and Leo Tolstoy). During the Soviet era, his legacy fell into obscurity and his works were seldom reprinted. Rediscovered by a wider public in the early 21st century, Maksimov's major writings are now once again regularly published (as inexpensive paperbacks) in Russia. His major writings have never been translated into foreign languages, so he remains little known outside the Russian-speaking countries.
