= Vasily Shaptsiaboi =

Belarusian Paralympic biathlete

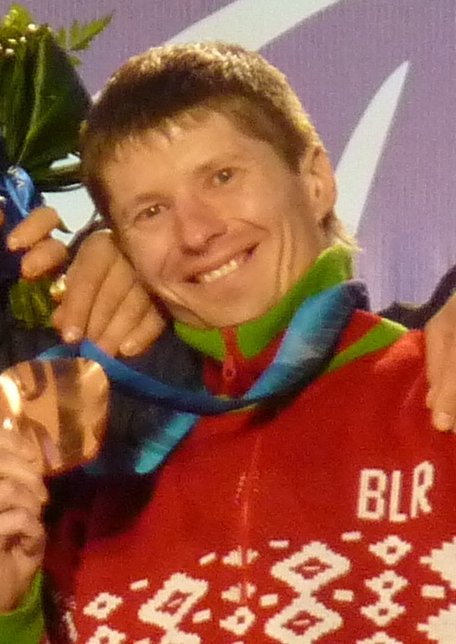

Personal information
- Born: 10 November 1979 (age 46) Mogilev, Soviet Union
Medal record
Representing Belarus
Men's Biathlon
Paralympic Games
Gold medal – first place	2004 Athens	Men's Tandem Road Race
Gold medal – first place	2004 Athens	Men's Time Trial
Bronze medal – third place	2000 Sydney	Men's T13 Track Athletics Relay

Vasily Shaptsiaboi (Belarusian: Васіль Шапцябой) is a Belarusian Paralympic biathlete, cross-country skier, and road bicycle racer who won many medals at both Winter and Summer Paralympic Games.

== Career ==
He began his Paralympic career in Sydney, Australia in 2000 where he won bronze medal in Men's T13 Track Athletics Relay. In 2004 he participated at the Athens Paralympic Games at which he won gold medals in both Men's Tandem Road Race and Time Trial for Visually Impaired. His first Winter Paralympics appearance was at the Vancouver Paralympic Games where he won two bronze medals in 3 km Biathlon and Cross-Country 20 km Freestyle. In 2011 he participated at the IPC Nordic Skiing World Cup which was hosted in Sjusjoe, Norway. He also took participation in various cycling events at the London Paralympic Games. On 8 March 2014, he won a bronze medal in biathlon which was hosted in Sochi, Russia.
