= Yannick Bourseaux =

French Paralympic sportsman

Personal information
- Nationality: French
- Born: 18 February 1975 (age 51)
- Height: 173 cm (5 ft 8 in)
Medal record
Men's Paratriathlon
Representing France
World Championships
Gold medal – first place	2005 Honolulu	AWAD Men
Gold medal – first place	2006 Lausanne	AWAD Men Upper Extremity
Gold medal – first place	2011 Beijing	TRI 4
Gold medal – first place	2012 Auckland	TRI 4
Silver medal – second place	2013 London	TRI 4
Silver medal – second place	2016 Rotterdam	PT4
Bronze medal – third place	2015 Chicago	PT4
European Championships
Gold medal – first place	2006 Autun	AWAD
Silver medal – second place	2013 Alanya	TRI 4
Silver medal – second place	2014 Kitzbühel	PT4
Bronze medal – third place	2015 Geneva	PT4
Bronze medal – third place	2016 Lisbon	PT4
Bronze medal – third place	2018 Tartu	PTS5

Yannick Bourseaux (born 18 February 1975) is a French competitor in Paralympic biathlon, cross-country skiing and paratriathlon.

Before the accident that paralysed his arm, he was an elite able-bodied triathlete on the French National triathlon team.

Bourseaux competed in biathlon and cross-country skiing in the Torino (2006) and Vancouver (2010) Winter Paralympics but did not win any medals.

He won the TRI 4 (arm impairment) paratriathlon title at the ITU Triathlon World Championships in 2011 and 2012 and came second to Paralympic swimmer Martin Schultz in 2013.

After defending his TRI 4 title at the 2012 ITU Paratriathlon World Championships, Bourseaux was named International Paralympic Committee "Athlete of the Month".
