= Irek Zaripov =

Russian biathlete and cross-country skier (born 1983)

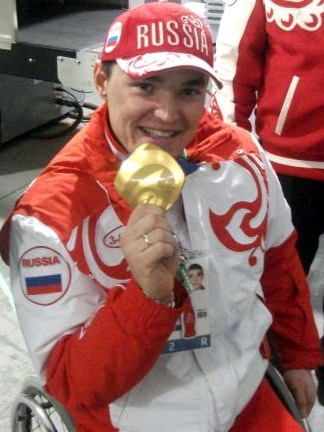

Personal information
- Born: March 27, 1983 (age 43) Sterlitamak, Russia

Sport
- Sport: Skiing
Medal record
Representing Russia
Paralympic Games
Men's cross country skiing
Gold medal – first place	2010 Vancouver	15 km
Gold medal – first place	2010 Vancouver	10 km
Silver medal – second place	2010 Vancouver	1 km Sprint
Men's biathlon
Gold medal – first place	2010 Vancouver	pursuit
Gold medal – first place	2010 Vancouver	individual
- Updated on April 14, 2010

Irek Zaripov (Russian: Ирек Айратович Зарипов, Bashkir: Ирек Айрат улы Зәрипов; born March 27, 1983) is a Russian biathlete and cross-country skier.

He was born on March 27, 1983, in Sterlitamak, USSR.

He lost his legs in a car accident in 2000. He started to practice skiing in 2005.

He competed at the 2010 Winter Paralympics where he won five medals: two gold and one silver in cross country skiing, and two gold medals in biathlon.

He has a son named Aynur.
