= A3 (classification) =

Amputee sports classification

A3 is an amputee sport classification used by the International Sports Organization for the Disabled (ISOD) for people with acquired or congenital amputations. A3 classified sportspeople have both legs amputated below knee. Their amputations impact their sport performance, including having balance issues, increased energy costs, higher rates of oxygen consumption, and issues with their gait. Sports people in this class are eligible to participate in include athletics, swimming, sitting volleyball, archery, weightlifting, badminton, lawn bowls, sitzball and wheelchair basketball.

== Definition ==
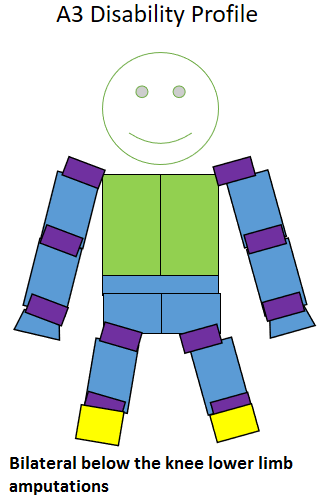
Type of amputation for an A3 classified sportsperson.

This class is for people who have both legs amputated below knee. This classification is sometimes abbreviated as B/K. In competing in other sports, this class may have a different name:

| Class | Abbr | Athletics | Cycling | Skiing | Swimming | Comparable classifications in other sports | Ref |
|---|---|---|---|---|---|---|---|
| A3 | B/K | T43, F43, T54, F58 | LC4 | LW 3 | S5, S7, S8 | Badminton: W3. Lawn bowls: LB1, LB2. Sitting volleyball: Open. Sitzball: Open. Ten-pin bowling: TPB8, TPB9. Cerebral palsy: CP4. Wheelchair basketball: 4 point player, 4.5 point player. | |

== Performance and physiology ==
The nature of a person's amputations in this class can effect their physiology and sports performance. Because of the potential for balance issues related to having an amputation, during weight training, amputees are encouraged to use a spotter when lifting more than 15 pounds (6.8 kg). Lower limb amputations effect a person's energy cost for being mobile. To keep their oxygen consumption rate similar to people without lower limb amputations, they need to walk slower. People in this class use around 41% more oxygen to walk or run the same distance as someone without a lower limb amputation.

People in this class can have a number of problems with their gait. There are a number of different causes for these issues, and suggested ways to modify them. For a gait that has abrupt heel contact, the cause can be excessive heel lever. This can be fixed by realigning their prosthetic foot. For jerky knee motions, the cause could be a loose socket in the knee or inadequate suspension. In that case, the socket might need replacing or they may need to realign the prosthesis. If they have prolonged heel contact, the cause could be problems with the heel lever in their prosthesis or a worn out heel. These are fixed by increasing heel stiffness or realigning the prosthesis. In some cases, prolong heel contact or knees remaining fulling extended is a problem with training in how to use the prosthesis. Another issue might be foot drag. This can be caused by an ill fitting prosthesis that can be fixed by shortening the length of the prosthesis. Some people in this class could have uneven length strides. This can be a result of problems with hip flexion or insecurity about their walk. Both are fixed by physical therapy.

== Governance ==
This classification was set up by ISOD, with the current version adopted in 1992 and then modified in 1993. IWAS was created following the merger of ISOD and International Stoke Mandeville Games Federation (ISMGF) in 2005. Subsequently, IWAS became the classification governing body for some amputee sports. In a few cases for wheelchair events run by IWAS, CP-ISRA parallel classes may be used to allow wheelchair using amputees to compete in these events. In the case of A3, this means that CP4 sportspeople from CP-ISRA may be in their class.

== Sports ==
=== Athletics ===
For athletics competitions that use the IPC athletics classification system, this class competes in T43, F43, T54 and F58. People in this class use a prosthetic limb when competing in athletics. It has three parts: a socket, a shank and a foot. In the late 2000s, research suggested that in athletics running events, double below the knee amputees could have a competitive advantage when running against their able-bodied counterparts because their prostheses provide a competitive advantage.

Double amputees have difficulty using a starting block in track events because they cannot align their legs with the block in the standard way. They often use different starting positions as a result. They have a different stride to able-bodied runners, with their artificial limbs having increased ground contact time, shorter leg swing time, and less time in the air while running.

A study comparing the performance of athletics competitors at the 1984 Summer Paralympics found there was no significant difference in performance in times between women in A1, A2 and A3 in the discus, women in A2 and A3 in the discus, women in A3 and A4 in the javelin, women in A2 and A3 in the shot put, women in A2, A3 and A4 in the long jump, women in A2 and A3 in the 100 meter race, men in A1, A2 and A3 in the discus, men in the A3, A4, A5, A6, A7, A8 and A9 in the discus, men in A2, A3 and A4 in the discus, men in A1, A2, A3, A4, A5, A6, A7, A8 and A9 in the javelin, men in A2, A3 and A4 in the javelin, men in A1, A2 and A3 in the shot put, men in A2, A3 and A4 in the shot put, men in A2, A3 and A4 in the high jump, men in A2 and A3 in the 100 meter race, men in A1, A2, A3 and A4 in the 400 meter race, and men in A2 and A3 in the 400 meter race.

Historically, because of low participation rates in men's T43 races, the class has been combined with the T44 class. The combined class was then called T44 and included both single and double below the knee amputees. There was a push in 2008 to avoid this happening because of a perception that double below knee amputees had a competitive advantage compared to single below knee amputees. Subsequent research related to results for men at the 2012 Summer Paralympics in London confirmed this to be the case for both the 200 meters and 400 meters. Double below the knee amputees also have a competitive advantage when compared to double above the knee amputees. From the 2004 Summer Paralympics to the 2012 Summer Paralympics, there was no significant changes in performance times put up by male sprinters in 100 meter, 200 meter and 400 meter events.

When CP4 athletes who are world record holders in their class have been put into a parallel athletics class with amputee athletes from this class because of comparable disability types, they have under-performed.

Use of a specially made carbon fibre running prosthetic leg assists runners in this class in lowering their heart rate compared to using a prosthetic not designed for running. Runnings at this class can have lower metabolic costs compared to elite runners over middle and long distances. In general, track athletes with amputations should be considerate of the surface they are running on, and avoid asphalt and cinder tracks.

One of the most famous competitors in this class is Oscar Pistorious. He has set world records in the 200 meters in athletics.

=== Basketball ===
For wheelchair basketball, sportspeople in this class tend to be classified a 4 point players or 4.5 point players. The cut off point between the two classes is generally based on the location of the amputations. People with amputations longer than 2/3rds the length of their thigh are generally 4.5 point players. Those with shorter amputations are 4 point players. Players in this class can have issues with controlling their sideways movements. Despite wheelchair basketball having been around since the first Paralympic Games, amputee players from this class were first allowed to be classified and participate internationally in 1983 following the creation of a functional classification system in Cologne, Germany by Horst Strokhkendl. Players from this class first competed at the 1983 Gold Cup Championships.

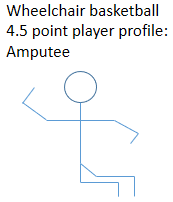
Potential amputation profile of a person in this class and their related wheelchair basketball classification

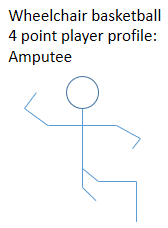
Potential amputation profile of a person in this class and their related wheelchair basketball classification

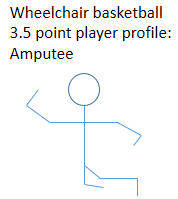
Potential amputation profile of a person in this class and their related wheelchair basketball classification

=== Cycling ===
People in this class tend to be classified in cycling events as LC4. The class is for cyclists with an impairment in both legs.

=== Swimming ===
People with amputations are eligible to compete in swimming at the Paralympic Games. A3 swimmers may be found in several classes. These include S5, S7, and S8. Prior to the 1990s, this class was often grouped with other amputee classes in swimming competitions, including the Paralympic Games. Swimmers in this class have a similar stroke length and stroke rate comparable to able bodied swimmers.

A study of was done comparing the performance of swimming competitors at the 1984 Summer Paralympics. It found there was no significant difference in performance in times between men and women in A2 and A3 in the 50 meter breaststroke, men and women in A2 and A3 in the 50 meter freestyle, men and women in A2, A3 and A4 in the 25 meter butterfly, and men in A2 and A3 in the 50 meter backstroke.

=== Other sports ===
Other sports people in this class are eligible to compete in include sitting volleyball, archery, and weightlifting . In both archery and sitting volleyball, different classes of amputees have historically competed against each other as one class for people with amputations or people who have a minimal disability level. In the case of weightlifting, amputees have also traditionally been grouped together, with divisions being based on weight instead. In powerlifting, only A1 and A3 are eligible as classes but they are categorized by weight, not classification type. They can also participate in badminton. When playing in a wheelchair, they compete as W3. Lawn bowls is another option. A3 competitors can be classified as LB1 or LB2. Players have the choice to compete in sitting or standing. Ten pin bowling is also open to people in this class. They compete in the TPB8 class and TPB9 class.

Another sport open to people in this class is sitzball, the precursor to sitting volleyball. It is open to A1 to A9 classified players along with anyone who might be classified as "les autres" or who have lesser amputations that would not qualify them for ISOD classification. It is not open to people with spinal cord injuries. Play is open, with no requirements as to which types of disabilities are on the court at any time.

Rowing is another sport open to people with amputations. In 1991, the first internationally accepted adaptive rowing classification system was established and put into use. People from this class were initially classified as A2 for people with double amputations.

== Becoming classified ==
Classification is often based on the anatomical nature of the amputation. The classification system takes several things into account when putting people into this class. These include which limbs are affected, how many limbs are affected, and how much of a limb is missing.

For this class, classification generally has four phases. The first stage of classification is a health examination. For amputees, this is often done on site at a sports training facility or competition. The second stage is observation in practice, the third stage is observation in competition and the last stage is assigning the sportsperson to a relevant class. Sometimes the health examination may not be done on site because the nature of the amputation could cause not physically visible alterations to the body. This is especially true for lower limb amputees as it relates to how their limbs align with their hips and the impact this has on their spine and how their skull sits on their spine.

During the observation phase involving training or practice for track and field, athletes in this class may be asked to demonstrate their skills in athletics, such as running, jumping or throwing. A determination is then made as to what classification an athlete should compete in. Classifications may be Confirmed or Review status. For athletes who do not have access to a full classification panel, Provisional classification is available; this is a temporary Review classification, considered an indication of class only, and generally used only in lower levels of competition.
