= CP4 =

CP4 may refer to:

- CP4 (classification), a disability sport classification specific to cerebral palsy
- an agrobacterium strain that is resistant to glyphosate and was the source for the CP4 EPSPS gene that is used in glyphosate-resistant genetically modified crops
- a class of chemically peculiar stars
- one of the Network Rail Control Periods
- CP^{4}, a specific complex projective space
- cP4, the Pearson symbol used in crystallography to describe a specific cubic crystal structure with four atoms in the unit cell
- CP4: an EEG electrode site according to the 10-20 system
- Punggol MRT/LRT station, MRT station code CP4
