= Amputee sports classification =

Disability sports classification system used for amputees

Amputee sports classification is a disability specific sport classification used for disability sports to facilitate fair competition among people with different types of amputations. This classification was set up by International Sports Organization for the Disabled (ISOD), and is currently managed by IWAS who ISOD merged with in 2005. Several sports have sport specific governing bodies managing classification for amputee sportspeople.

Classification for amputee athletes began in the 1950s and 1960s. By the early 1970s, it was formalized with 27 different classes. This was reduced to 12 in 1976, and then down to 9 in 1992 ahead of the Barcelona Paralympics. By the 1990s, a number of sports had developed their own classification systems that in some cases were not compatible with the ISOD system. This included swimming, table tennis and equestrian as they tried to integrate multiple types of disabilities in their sports. Amputee sportspeople have specific challenges that are different from other types of disability sportspeople.

The classes for ISOD's amputee sports classification system are A1, A2, A3, A4, A5, A6, A7, A8 and A9. The first four are for people with lower limb amputations. A5 through A8 are for people with upper limb amputations. A9 is for people with combinations of upper and lower limb amputations. The classification system is largely medical, and generally has four stages. The first is a medical examination. The second is observation at practice or training. The third is observation during competition. The final is being put into a classification group. There is some variance to this based on sport specific needs.

== Purpose ==
The purpose of sport specific amputee classification is to facilitate fair play between people with different types of disabilities, and enable people to compete on equal terms that they are prevented from doing when competing against able-bodied competitors because of their amputation. The classification system was designed for people with "...acquired amputations and dysmelia resembling acquired amputations." Their classification system excludes people with "dysmelia not resembling acquired amputations". The classification system does not use a performance based one as such a system would be unfair.

== Governance ==
This classification was set up by International Sports Organization for the Disabled (ISOD). ISOD also governed les autres, but uses a different and separate classification system for non-amputees. The ISOD classification system for amputees is sometimes called ISOD (amputee) to differentiate between the two systems. IWAS was created following the merger of ISOD and International Stoke Mandeville Games Federation (ISMGF) in 2005. Subsequently, IWAS became the classification governing body for some amputee sports.

The International Paralympic Committee (IPC) is the governing body for a number of sports, and their related sport specific classification systems. These sports, open to people with amputees, include athletics, swimming, biathlon, ice sledge hockey, powerlifting, shooting, Nordic skiing, and wheelchair dance. Other sports are governed by their own international bodies. This includes FITA for archery, UCI for cycling, FEI for para-equestrian, FISA for rowing, ITTF for table tennis, ITF for wheelchair tennis, and the IWBF for wheelchair basketball.

Classification can also be handled on a national level for national level sport.

== Disability type and definitions ==
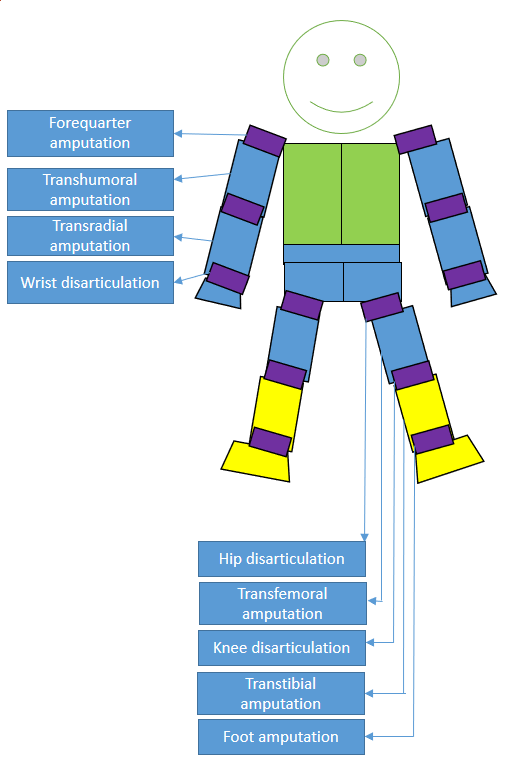
Locations of amputations

There are a number of different types of amputations that describe the location of the amputation. A transhumeral amputation is an above the elbow amputation. It is sometimes referred to as AE. A transradial amputation is a below the elbow amputation. A transfemoral amputation is an above the knee amputation, and is sometimes referred to as AK. LEA is sometimes used to refer to lower limb amputations. A bilateral amputee is a person who is missing either both upper limbs or both lower limbs. People who are missing both legs below the knee are sometimes referred to as BK while people missing both arms below the elbow are referred as BE. Transtibial amputation is a below the knee amputation. A forequarter amputation includes the arm, shoulder, clavicle, and scapula. A partial foot amputation is when the metatarsal section of the foot is amputated. This is called a transmetatarsal amputation. A shoulder disarticulation, also called SD, is when an arm is amputated through the shoulder joint. A Symes amputation is an amputation in the foot at the heel that allows for the leg to bear weight. A unilateral amputation is a single amputation that effects only one side of the body. A wrist disarticulation, also called WD, is an amputation of the hand at the wrist.

There are also a number of terms that describe the type of amputation. An acquired amputation is one in which a limb is removed as a result of disease or trauma. Diabetic amputation is a result of diabetes complications. A dysvascular amputation is a result of poor vascular circulation. A traumatic amputation is one resulting from injury.

== History ==
The early history of amputee sport had concurrent histories, with European and American amputee sports developing during the 1950s and 1960s, largely independent of each other. In Europe, unilateral and bilateral lower limb amputees participated in sports using prosthetic limbs. In the United States, these types of amputees participated in wheelchair sports instead.

International Sports Organization for the Disabled (ISOD) was created in 1964, and created the first formalized system of classification to facilitate organized sporting competition between people with different types of amputations. There were originally 27 different classes of different types of amputations. This system proved untenable because of the large number of classes. In 1976, the total number of classes was reduced to twelve ahead of the 1976 Paralympic Games. In 1992, ahead of the Barcelona hosted Paralympics, the classification system again was changed with the total number of classes reduced to the nine that currently exist today. Despite this, sometimes classes with different levels of performances would compete against each other in the same event for a medal at the Paralympic level. Small changes were formalized in 1993.

Starting in the 1990s, changes in the classification system meant that in athletics and swimming, sportspeople with amputations were competing against sportspeople with disabilities like cerebral palsy. Historically, disability sport has been governed by different sport organizations: Cerebral Palsy-International Sport and Recreation Association (CP-ISRA), International Stoke Mandeville Wheelchair Sports Federation (ISMWSF), and ISOD. Following the 2000 Summer Paralympics, there was a push in the wider disability sport community to move away from disability specific classification systems to a more unified classification system that incorporated multiple disability types. By 2000, swimming, table tennis, and equestrian had already done that with amputees being given sport specific classifications for these sports. The desire was to increase the number of sports doing that integration.

IWAS was created following the merger of ISOD and International Stoke Mandeville Games Federation (ISMGF) in 2005. Subsequently, IWAS became the classification governing body for some amputee sports.

== Classes ==
There are nine classes specifically created for people with amputations. These classes are A1, A2, A3, A4, A5, A6, A7, A8 and A9.

Class	Descriptions	Abbr.	Athletics	Cycling	Skiing	Swimming	Comparable classifications in other sports	Ref
A1	Bilateral above the knee lower limb amputations	A/K	T42, F42, T54, F56, F57	C1, H5	LW1, LW12.2	S6, S7, S8	Badminton: W3 Lawn bowls: LB1 Powerlifting: Weight specific class Sitting volleyball: Open Sitzball: Open Ten-pin bowling: TPB8 Wheelchair basketball: 3 point player, 3.5 point player Wheelchair fencing: 3	
A2	Unilateral above the knee lower limb amputations	A/K	T42, T54, F42, F57	C2, C3, H5	LW 2	S9	Amputee basketball: Open Amputee football: Field player Lawn bowls: LB2 Sitting volleyball: Open Sitzball: Open Ten-pin bowling: TPB8, TPB9 Wheelchair basketball: 4 point player Cerebral palsy: CP3	
A3	Bilateral below the knee lower limb amputations	B/K	T43, F43, T54, F57	C3, H5	LW 3	S8, S9	Badminton: W3 Lawn bowls: LB1, LB2 Powerlifting: Weight specific class Sitting volleyball: Open Sitzball: Open Ten-pin bowling: TPB8, TPB9 Cerebral palsy: CP4 Wheelchair basketball: 4 point player, 4.5 point player	
A4	Unilateral below the knee lower limb amputations	B/K	T44, F44, T54, F57	C4, H5	LW 4	S10	Amputee basketball: Open Amputee football: Field player Lawn bowls: LB2 Rowing: LTA Sitting volleyball: Open Sitzball: Open Ten-pin bowling: TPB8, TPB9 Wheelchair basketball: 4 point player, 4.5 point player	
A5	Bilateral above the elbow upper limb amputations	A/E	T45, F45		LW5/7-1, LW5/7-2	S6	Lawn bowls: LB3 Sitzball: Open	
A6	Unilateral above the elbow upper limb amputations	A/E	T46, F46	C5	LW6/8.1	S8	Amputee basketball: Open Amputee football: Goalkeeper Lawn bowls: LB3 Sitzball: Open Ten-pin bowling: TPB10	
A7	Bilateral below the elbow upper limb amputations	B/E	T45, F45	C4	LW 5/7-3	S7, S8	Lawn bowls: LB3 Sitzball: Open	
A8	Unilateral below the elbow upper limb amputations	B/E	T46, F46	C5	LW 6/8.2	S9	Amputee basketball: Open Amputee football: Goalkeeper Badminton: STU5 Lawn bowls: LB3 Rowing: LTA Sitzball: Open Ten-pin bowling: TPB10	
A9	Combination of amputations of the upper and lower limbs		T42, T43, T44, F42, F43, F44, F56, F57	C1–5	LW9.1, LW9.2	S1-S8	Amputee basketball: Open Lawn bowls: LB1, LB2 Sitting volleyball: Open Sitzball: Open Ten-pin bowling: TPB8, TPB9 Wheelchair basketball: 2 point player, 3 point player, 4 point player	

Some sports have their own classification systems, including athletics, swimming, table tennis, and equestrian. Classification for athletics is handled by IPC Athletics. Lower limb amputees are generally classified into T42 to T44. Wheelchair basketball classification does not use the ISOD system. The sport takes into account the length of the amputation beyond just above or below the knee when assigning a player to a class. It also takes into account any amputations that may occur in the upper limbs. Amputee players in this sport are then generally classified as 2, 2.5, 3, 3.5, 4 or 4.5 point players Powerlifting is open only to people in classes A1 and A3 as an open class based on weight. No other classes are eligible.

Other sports are inclusive of all people with certain types of amputations. Sitting volleyball is one example, which is open to A1 to A4 and A9, and where everyone competes on the same team. Archery is another example where amputees have traditionally all competed in the same class. Amputee basketball uses the ISOD classification system

Because people with other types of disabilities also use wheelchairs, sometimes their classification systems have recognition with a parallel class using the IWAS system. This is the case for cerebral palsy sport, where CP-ISRA's CP3 competitors compete as IWAS A2 and CP-ISRA's CP4 competitors compete as IWAS A3.

== Performance ==
Amputee sportspeople have some sport specific issues related to their bodies when participating in sports. Because of the potential for balance issues related to having an amputation, during weight training, amputees are encouraged to use a spotter when lifting more than 15 pounds (6.8 kg).

Amputees in this class who are amputees as a result of a traumatic amputation have a cardiopulmonary physiology similar to able-bodied athletes. Lower limb amputations affect a person's energy cost for being mobile. To keep their oxygen consumption rate similar to people without lower limb amputations, they need to walk more slowly. Lower limb amputees with longer shanks can walk further, expend less energy while walking and have increased strength in their thighs compared to lower limb amputees with shorter shanks.

Because they are missing a limb, amputees are more prone to overuse injuries in their remaining limbs.

== Prosthetic limbs ==
In some sports and specific classes, amputees can use prosthetic limbs. This is true in athletics for leg amputees. These have different designs based on where the amputation occurs. Blades for above the knee amputees have four parts: a socket, a knee, a shank and a foot, while blades for below the knee amputees have three: a socket, a shank and a foot.

== Criticism ==
There has been some criticism of the classification system because of groupings of sportspeople with different types of amputations. This is because of a perception and some research that supports the idea that in some events, such as 200 meter and 400 meter track events, double below the knee amputee prostheses give the runner a competitive advantage over single below the knee amputees. Grouping double and single below the knee amputees together is seen as disadvantaging single below the knee amputees.

== Classification process ==
Classification is often based on the anatomical nature of the amputation. The classification system takes several things into account when putting people into this class. These include which limbs are affected, how many limbs are affected, and how much of a limb is missing.

For this class, classification generally has four phases. The first stage of classification is a health examination. For amputees, this is often done on site at a sports training facility or competition. The second stage is observation in practice, the third stage is observation in competition and the last stage is assigning the sportsperson to a relevant class. Sometimes the health examination may not be done on site because the nature of the amputation could cause alterations to the body which are not physically visible. This is especially true for lower limb amputees, as it relates to how their limbs align with their hips, the impact this has on their spine and how their skull sits on their spine.

The classification process can be sport specific. In the case of athletics and lower limb amputees, they are assessed based on their functional ability. For wheelchair basketball, part of the classification process involves observing a player during practice or training. This often includes observing them go one on one against someone who is likely to be in the same class the player would be classified into.
