= 4.5-point player =

Wheelchair basketball classification

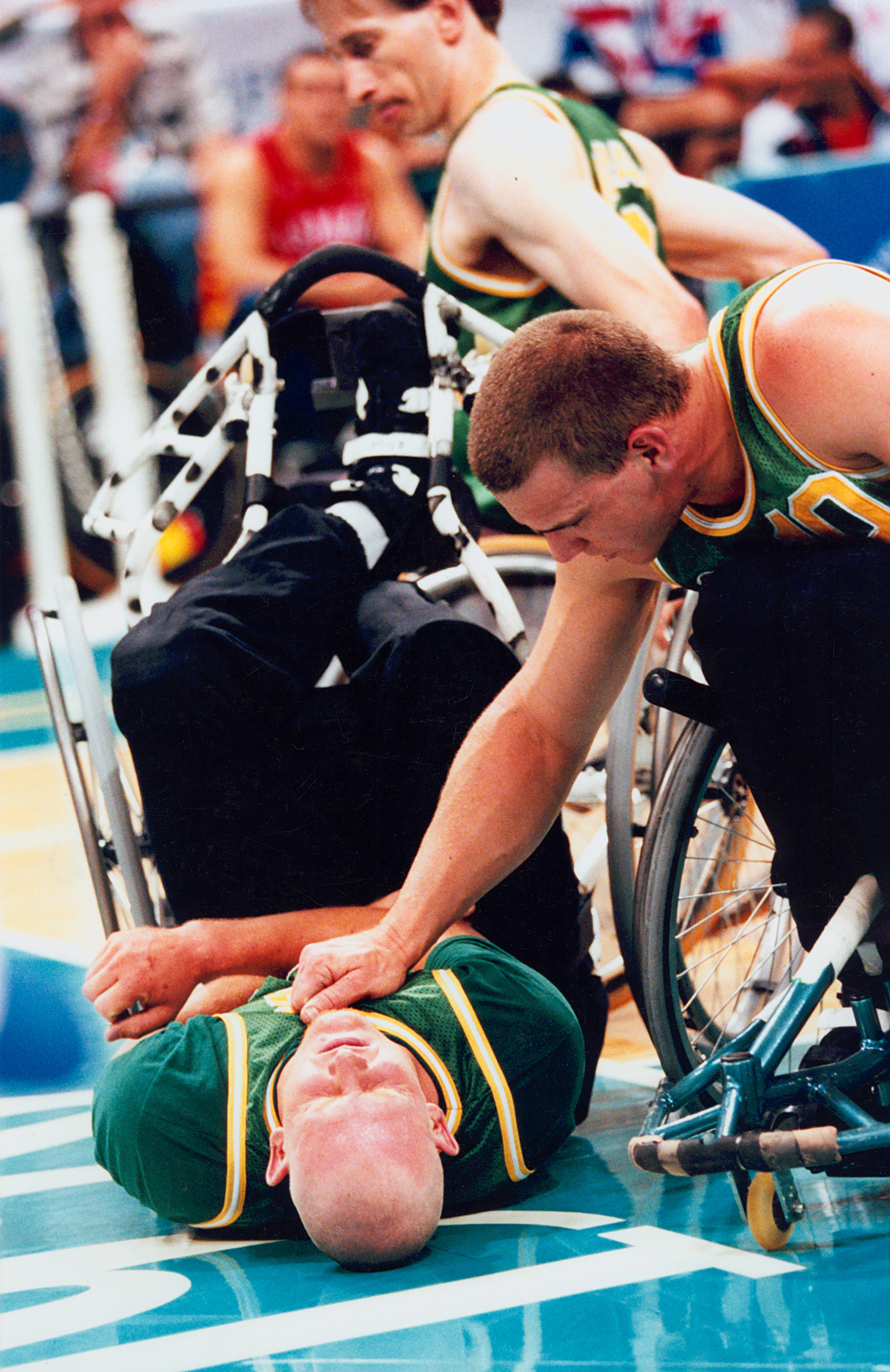
Troy Sachs is a 4.5-point player

4.5-point player is a disability sport classification for wheelchair basketball. Players in this class tend to have normal trunk movement, few problems with side-to-side movements, and ability to reach to the side of their chair. Players generally have a below-knee amputation, or some other partial single-leg dysfunction. This classification is for players with minimal levels of disability. In some places, there is a class beyond this called 5-point player for players with no disabilities.

The class includes people with amputations. Amputees are put into this class depending on the length of their stumps and if they play using prosthetic legs. Classification into this classes has four phases. They are a medical assessment, observation during training, observation during competition and assessment. Observation during training may include a game of one on one. Once put into this class, it is very difficult to be classified out of it.

Players in this class include Australia's Brad Ness, Troy Sachs and Justin Eveson.

== Sport ==
This classification is for wheelchair basketball. Classification for the sport is done by the International Wheelchair Basketball Federation. Classification is extremely important in wheelchair basketball because when players point totals are added together, they cannot exceed fourteen points per team on the court at any time. Jane Buckley, writing for the Sporting Wheelies, describes the wheelchair basketball players in this classification as players having: "Usually have minimal lower limb dysfunction or single below knee amputation. Normal trunk movements in all directions." The Australian Paralympic Committee defines this classification as: "Players with normal trunk movement in all directions who are able to reach side to side with no limitations." The International Wheelchair Basketball Federation defines a 4.5-point player as "Normal trunk movement in all directions, able to reach side to side with no limitations." The Cardiff Celts, a wheelchair basketball team in Wales, explain this classification as, "(minimal disability) [...] Typical Class 4.5 Disabilities include: Single below-knee amputees. Some double below-knee amputees. Players with extensive orthopedic involvement of hips, knees or ankles. Post-polio paralysis with minimal (ankle/foot) involvement on one or both sides."

== Beyond 4.5 ==
Beyond 4.5, there is sometimes used a 5-point player classification for able-bodied athletes. The 5-point player is not recognized by wheelchair basketball's governing body. There has been a push by the National Wheelchair Basketball Association to allow for able-bodied athletes to compete in wheelchair basketball games. The argument is the sport is called "wheelchair basketball," not "disability basketball." Able bodied athletes, in a wheelchair, have the same functionality as 4.5-point players.

== Strategy and on court performance ==
4.5-point players have the least amount of physical disability of all players on the court. Players in this class can move easily and forcefully in all directions. They have the ability to move while shooting and passing. They can grasp the ball above their head with one or both arms. They can quickly bring their wheelchair to a stop without tipping over.

4-point players and 4.5-point players receive less playing time than 1-point players because of their higher point value.

== Disability groups ==
A number of disability groups are eligible to compete in this class, including people with amputations and with spinal cord injuries.

=== Amputees ===
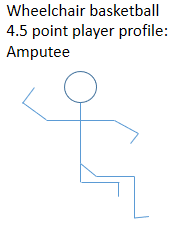
Profile of a wheelchair basketball player A4 amputation type

People with amputations may compete in this class, including people in IWAS classes A3 and A4. Because of the potential for balance issues related to having an amputation, during weight training, amputees are encouraged to use a spotter when lifting more than 15 pounds (6.8 kg).

==== A3 ====
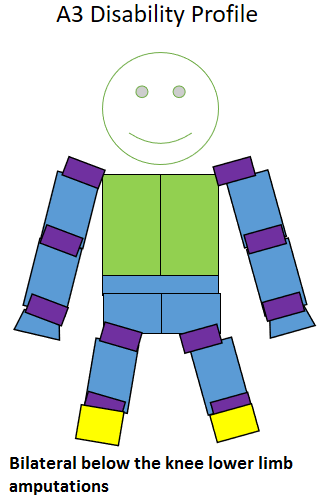
Type of amputation for an A3 classified sportsperson

ISOD classified A3 tend to be classified a 4-point players or 4.5-point players, though they could also be classified as 3.5-point players. The cutoff point between the three classes is generally based on the location of the amputations. People with amputations longer than 2/3 the length of their thigh are generally 4.5-point players. Those with shorter amputations are 4-point players. A3 players use around 41% more oxygen to walk or run the same distance as someone without a lower limb amputation. Players in this class can have issues with controlling their sideways movements.

Lower limb amputations effect a person's energy cost for being mobile. To keep their oxygen consumption rate similar to people without lower limb amputations, they need to walk slower. People in this class use around 41% more oxygen to walk or run the same distance as someone without a lower limb amputation.

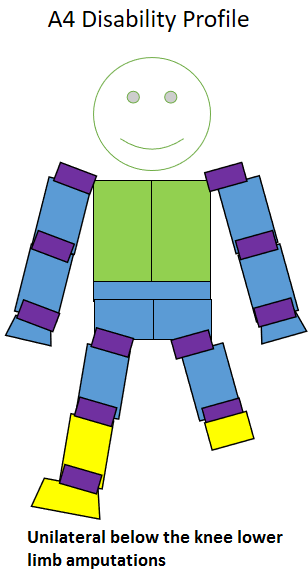
Type of amputation for an A4 classified sportsperson.

People in this class can have a number of problems with their gait. There are a number of different causes for these issues, and suggested ways to modify them. For a gait that has abrupt heel contact, the cause can be excessive heel lever. This can be fixed by realigning their prosthetic foot. For jerky knee motions, the cause could be a loose socket in the knee or inadequate suspension. In that case, the socket might need replacing or they may need to realign the prosthesis. If they have prolonged heel contact, the cause could be problems with the heel lever in their prosthesis or a worn out heel. These are fixed by increasing heel stiffness or realigning the prosthesis. In some cases, prolong heel contact or knees remaining fulling extended is a problem with training in how to use the prosthesis. Another issue might be foot drag. This can be caused by an ill fitting prosthesis that can be fixed by shortening the length of the prosthesis. Some people in this class could have uneven length strides. This can be a result of problems with hip flexion or insecurity about their walk. Both are fixed by physical therapy.

==== A4 ====
ISOD classified A4 tend to be classified a 4-point players or 4.5-point players. The cutoff point between the two classes is generally based on the location of the amputations. People with amputations longer than 2/3 the length of their thigh are generally 4.5-point players. Those with shorter amputations are 4-point players. A4 basketball players use around 7% more oxygen to walk or run the same distance as someone without a lower limb amputation.

=== Spinal cord injuries ===
People with spinal cord injuries compete in this class, including F8 sportspeople.

==== F8 ====
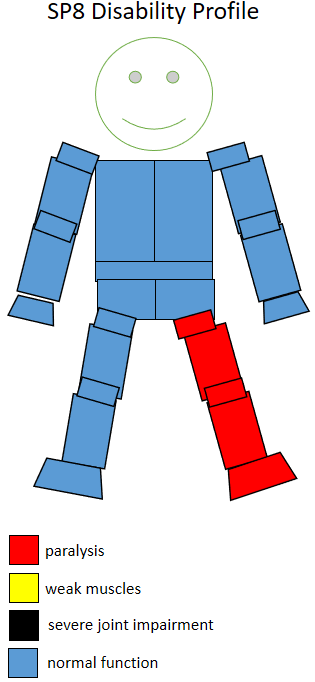
Functional profile of a wheelchair sportsperson in the F8 class.

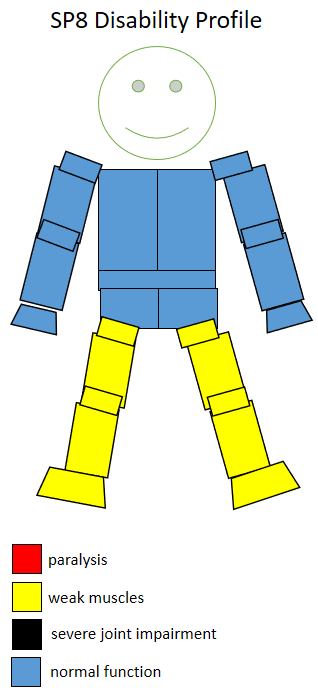
A profile of disability type of an F8 sportsperson.

In the earliest medical classifications for wheelchair basketball, they would have been ineligible to play. Under the current classification system, they would likely be classified as a 4.5-point player. F8 is standing wheelchair sport class. The level of spinal cord injury for this class involves people who have incomplete lesions at a slightly higher level. This means they can sometimes bear weight on their legs. In 2002, USA Track & Field defined this class as, "These are standing athletes with dynamic standing balance. Able to recover in standing when balance is challenged. Not more than 70 points in legs." In 2003, Disabled Sports USA defined this class as, "In a sitting class but not more than 70 points in the lower limbs. Are unable to recover balance in challenged standing position." In Australia, this class means combined lower plus upper limb functional problems. "Minimal disability." It can also mean in Australia that the athlete is "ambulant with moderately reduced function in one or both lower limbs." In Australia, the corresponding class for based on disability type classes are A2, A3, A9 and LAF5.

== History ==
The original classification system for wheelchair basketball was a 3 class medical one managed by ISMGF. Players in this system were class 3. Following the move to the functional classification system in 1983, class 3 players became class 4 players. The change also allowed amputee players to be part of this class, and they came to be some of the most dominant players in it. Some of the players currently in this class would have been ineligible to play because they did not meet eligible medical definitions for minimal disability.

At the IWBF 1998 World Congress, two proposals were made. One was to allow everyone to use strapping. Another was to specifically ban strapping by 4.5-point players. The practice of strapping had begun by lower-point players earlier in the sports history to give them better trunk control. Eventually, it was taken up by higher-point players and included leg strapping.

The classification was created by the International Paralympic Committee and has roots in a 2003 attempt to address "the overall objective to support and co-ordinate the ongoing development of accurate, reliable, consistent and credible sport focused classification systems and their implementation."

Wheelchair basketball players who competed at the 2012 Summer Paralympics in this classification needed to have their classification be in compliance with the system organised by the IWBF and their status being listed as ‘Review’ or ‘Confirmed’.

For the 2016 Summer Paralympics in Rio, the International Paralympic Committee had a zero classification at the Games policy. This policy was put into place in 2014, with the goal of avoiding last minute changes in classes that would negatively impact athlete training preparations. All competitors needed to be internationally classified with their classification status confirmed prior to the Games, with exceptions to this policy being dealt with on a case-by-case basis. In case there was a need for classification or reclassification at the Games despite best efforts otherwise, wheelchair basketball classification was scheduled for September 4 to 6 at Carioca Arena 1.

== Getting classified ==
Classification generally has four phases. The first stage of classification is a health examination. For amputees in this class, this is often done on site at a sports training facility or competition. The second stage is observation in practice, the third stage is observation in competition and the last stage is assigning the sportsperson to a relevant class. Sometimes the health examination may not be done on site for amputees because the nature of the amputation could cause not physically visible alterations to the body. This is especially true for lower limb amputees as it relates to how their limbs align with their hips and the impact this has on their spine and how their skull sits on their spine. For wheelchair basketball, part of the classification process involves observing a player during practice or training. This often includes observing them go one on one against someone who is likely to be in the same class the player would be classified into. Once a player is classified, it is very hard to be classified into a different classification. Players have been known to have issues with classification because some players play down their abilities during the classification process. At the same time, as players improve at the game, movements become regular and their skill level improves. This can make it appear like their classification was incorrect.

In Australia, wheelchair basketball players and other disability athletes are generally classified after they have been assessed based on medical, visual or cognitive testing, after a demonstration of their ability to play their sport, and the classifiers watching the player during competitive play.

== Competitors ==
Australians Brad Ness, Troy Sachs and Justin Eveson are 4.5-point players. Amber Merritt is 4.5-point player for Australia's women's national team. Joey Johnson, Patrick Anderson and David Eng are a 4.5-point players for the Canadian men's national team.

In Australia's Women's National Wheelchair Basketball League, able-bodied player Deanna Smith was a 4.5-point player.

== Variants ==
Wheelchair Twin Basketball is a major variant of wheelchair basketball. This version is supposed by the International Stoke Mandeville Wheelchair Sports Federation, and played in Japan. Twin basketball has a three-point classification system based on the evaluation of the mobility of people with cervical cord injuries. In this variant, the equivalent to 4.5-point players would be players without a head band. These players are "Players without a headband (no band players) - the players possess good triceps, a good balance of the hand and some finger functions. They can score by shooting with a smaller and lighter basketball to the normal basket."
