= CP4 (classification) =

Cerebral palsy sports classification

CP4 is a disability sport classification specific to cerebral palsy. In many sports, it is grouped inside other classifications to allow people with cerebral palsy to compete against people with other different disabilities but the same level of functionality. Compared lower number CP classes, they have fewer issues with head movement and trunk function. They tend to use wheelchairs on a daily basis though they may be ambulant with the use of assistive devices.

Sports that CP4 athletes are eligible to participate in include athletics, cycling, skiing, slalom, swimming, wheelchair tennis, wheelchair fencing, wheelchair curling, wheelchair basketball, table tennis, sledge hockey, shooting, sailing, rowing, powerlifting, para-equestrian, race running and archery. In some of these sports, different classification systems or names for CP4 are used. When they attend a classifying event, they go with their wheelchair to avoid being put into an ambulatory class.

== Definition and participation ==
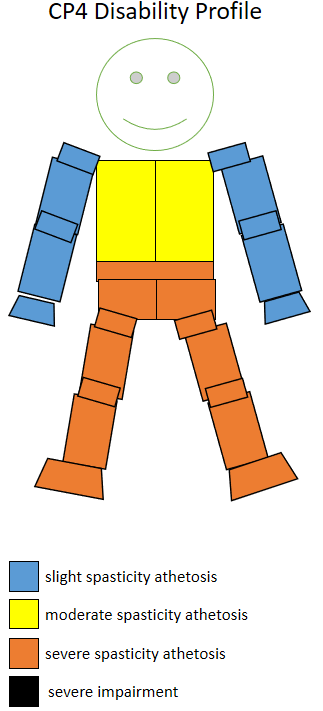
The spasticity athetosis level and location of a CP4 sportsperson.

Cerebral Palsy-International Sports and Recreation Association (CP-ISRA) defined this class in January 2005 as, "Diplegic - Moderate to Severe involvement. Good functional strength with minimal limitation or control problems noted in upper limbs and trunk. Lower Extremities-Moderate to severe involvement in both legs Spasticity Grade 4 to 3 usually rendering them non-functional for ambulation over long distances without the use of assistive devices. A wheelchair is usually the choice for sport. Trunk-Spasticity grade 2 to 1. Minimal limitation of trunk movements when wheeling and throwing. In some athletes fatigue can increase spasticity which can be overcome with proper positioning. When standing, poor balance is obvious even using assistive devices. Upper Extremities-The upper limbs often show normal functional strength. Minimal limitation of range of movement may be present but a close to normal follow through and propulsion is observed when throwing or wheeling."

== Performance ==
On a daily basis, CP4 sportspeople in this class are likely to use a wheelchair. Some may be ambulant with the use of assistive devices. They have minimal control problems in upper limbs and torso, and good upper body strength. Head movement and trunk function differentiate this class from CP3. Lack of symmetry in arm movement are another major difference between the two classes, with CP3 competitors having less symmetry.

== Sports ==
=== Athletics ===
In athletics events, CP4 competitors participate in T34/F34 classes. In some cases, CP4 athletes may be classified as F54, F55 or F56. Events that may be on the program for CP4 competitors include the club, discus throw, shot put and javelin. While they may be able to walk with assistance, competitors throw from a fixed seated position.

=== Cycling ===
CP4 sportspeople are eligible to compete in cycling at the elite level and the Paralympic Games. CP1 to CP4 competitors may compete using tricycles in the T1 class. Tricycles are only eligible to compete in road events, not track ones. Tricycles are required because cyclists at this left have their balance effected by their cerebral palsy and they are unable to use a standard bicycle. CP4 cyclists are required to wear a helmet, with a special color used to designate their class. CP4 class competitors wear a white helmet.

=== Skiing ===
CP4 athletes are eligible to compete in skiing competitions at the elite level and the Paralympic Games. CP4 Nordic skiers compete in LW10, LW11 and LW12. CP4 alpine skiers compete in LW10, LW11 or LW12.

=== Slalom ===
One of the available sports for CP4 competitors is slalom. Slalom involves an obstacle course for people using carts. CP4 competitors use self-propelled carts to navigate the course.

=== Swimming ===
People with cerebral palsy are eligible to compete in swimming at the Paralympic Games. CP4 swimmers may be found in several classes. These include S4, and S5.

CP4 swimmers tend to have a passive normalized drag in the range of 0.7 to 0.9. This puts them into the passive drag band of PDB6. Because of their balance issues, swimmers in this class can find the starting block problematic and often have slower times entering the water than other competitors in their class. Because the disability of swimmers in this class involves in a loss of function in specific parts of their body, they are more prone to injury than their able-bodied counterparts as a result of overcompensation in other parts of their body. When fatigued, asymmetry in their stroke becomes a problem for swimmers in this class.

=== Other sports ===
People with cerebral palsy are eligible to compete at the elite level in a number of other sports including wheelchair tennis, wheelchair fencing, wheelchair curling, wheelchair basketball, table tennis, sledge hockey, shooting, sailing, rowing, powerlifting, para-equestrian, and archery. Race running is another sport open to CP4 competitors. They are classified RR3.

== Classification process ==
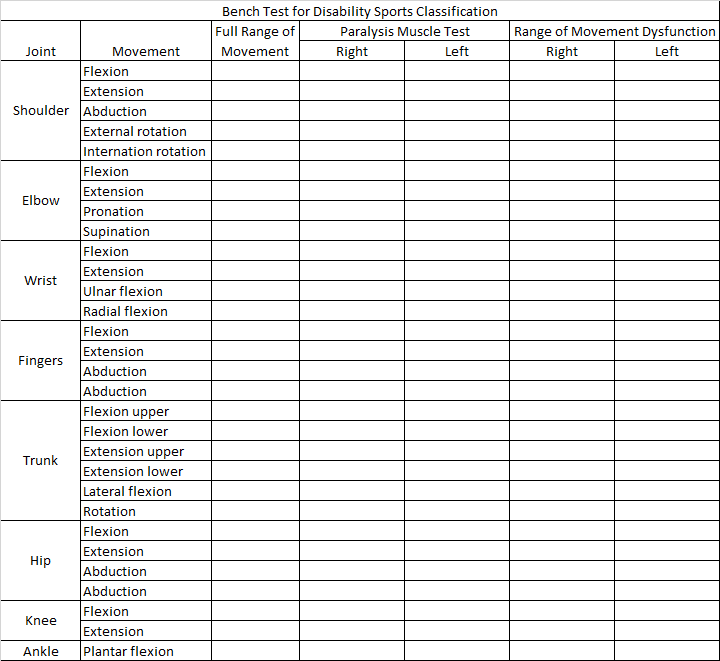
A standard bench press form used to for functional classification for wheelchair sportspeople.

While some CP4 people may be ambulatory, they generally go through the classification process while using a wheelchair. This is because they often compete from a seated position. If they do not attend classification in a wheelchair, they risk being classified as CP5 or a similar sport specific class for ambulant CP sportspeople.

One of the standard means of assessing functional classification is the bench test, which is used in swimming, lawn bowls and wheelchair fencing. Using the Adapted Research Council (MRC) measurements, muscle strength is tested using the bench press for a variety of disabilities a muscle being assessed on a scale of 1 to 5 for people with cerebral palsy and other issues with muscle spasticity. A 1 is for no functional movement of the muscle or where there is no motor coordination. A 2 is for normal muscle movement range not exceeding 25% or where the movement can only take place with great difficult and, even then, very slowly. A 3 is where normal muscle movement range does not exceed 50%. A 4 is when normal muscle movement range does not exceed 75% and or there is slight in-coordination of muscle movement. A 5 is for normal muscle movement.

Swimming classification generally has three components. The first is a bench press. The second is water test. The third is in competition observation. As part of the water test, swimmers are often required to demonstrate their swimming technique for all four strokes. They usually swim a distance of 25 meters for each stroke. They are also generally required to demonstrate how they enter the water and how they turn in the pool.
