= LW11 =

Paralympic skiing classification

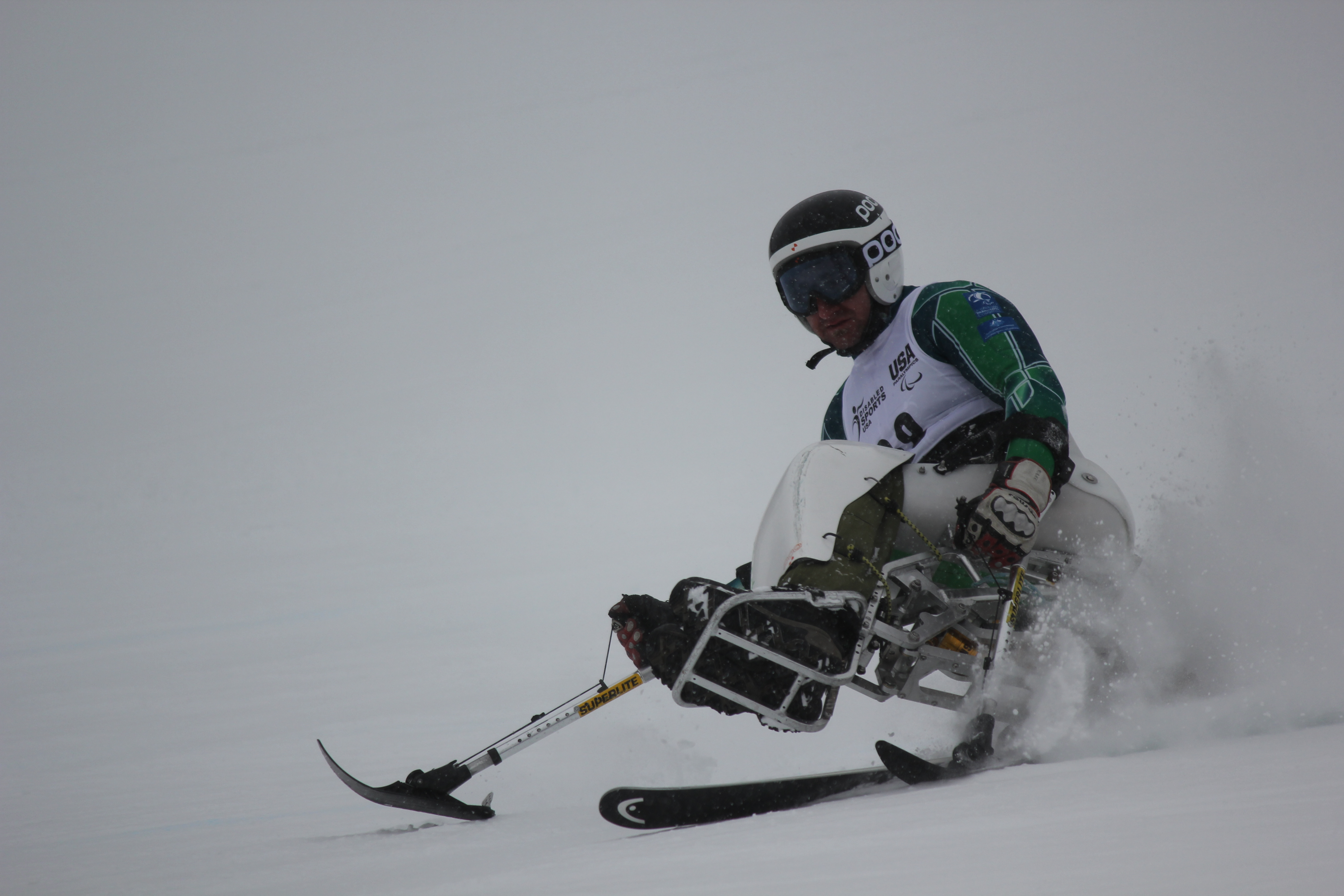
LW11 skier Mark Soyer at the 2012 IPC NorAm Cup

LW11 is a Para alpine and Para Nordic sit skiing sport class, a classification defined by the International Paralympic Committee (IPC) for people with paralysis in the lower extremities and people with cerebral palsy that affects the lower half of the body. Outside of skiing, the competitor in this class is unable to walk. For international competitions, classification is done through IPC Alpine Skiing or IPC Nordic Skiing. For sub-international competitions, classification is done by a national federation such as Alpine Canada.

In para-alpine skiing, the skier uses a mono-ski, while para-Nordic skiers use a two ski sit-ski. Skiers in this class use outriggers, and are required to wear special helmets for some para-alpine disciplines. In learning to ski, one of the first skills learned is getting into and out of the ski, and how to position the body in the ski in order to maintain balance. The skier then learns how to fall and to get up.

A factoring system is used in the sport to allow different classes to compete against each other when there are too few individual competitors in one class in a competition. The factoring for LW11 alpine skiing classification during the 2011/2012 skiing season was 0.785 for slalom, 0.8508 for giant slalom, 0.8324 for super-G and 0.8333 for downhill. The percentage for the 2012/2013 para-Nordic season was 94% and for LWXI.5 was 98%. This classification has been able to compete at different skiing competitions including the Paralympics, IPC Alpine World Championships and the IPC Nordic Skiing World Championships. Skiers in this class include Austrian Robert Frohle.

== Definition ==
This is a para-alpine and para-Nordic sit-skiing classification, where LW stands for Locomotor Winter. This classification is for people with paralysis in the lower extremities and includes people with cerebral palsy that affects the lower half of the body. Outside of skiing, the competitor in this class is unable to walk, the skier "may have loss of buttock sensibility S1-25". For the 1998 Winter Paralympics, the classification was described as "Disability of lower limbs with a fair sitting balance-paraplegia and standing classes with impairment in the lower limbs together with functional impairment of trunk/hip." Adapted Physical Education and Sport described this class as "Athletes with disabilities in the lower limbs and fair sitting balance (e.g., para classes lower 3 and 4), standing I. classes with impairment of the lower limbs together with significant functional impairment of the trunk and hips, any function in the lower limbs may not be used outside of the equipment at any time during the race; point score 9 to 15 points." This classification is comparable to para classes lower 3 and 4.

Generally to be eligible for a sit-skiing classification, a skier needs to meet a minimum of one of several conditions including a single below knee but above ankle amputation, monoplegia that exhibits similar to below knee amputation, legs of different length where there is at least a 7 centimetres (2.8 in) difference, combined muscle strength in the lower extremities less than 71.

The International Paralympic Committee (IPC) defines this para-alpine classification as "a. Athletes with disabilities in the lower limbs and a fair sitting balance b. CP with disabilities in lower extremities" In 2002, the Australian Paralympic Committee defined this classification for para-alpine as a sit skiing classification for "athletes with disabilities in their lower limbs and fair sitting balance." The IPC defines this class for para-Nordic skiing as for "those with impairments in the lower limbs and trunk. The athlete retains the use of abdominal muscles and trunk extensor muscles, especially those muscle attaching to the pelvis." Cross Country Canada described this para-Nordic classification as "Impairment in the lower limbs and trunk with fair upper abdominal and trunk muscle activity with some functional sitting balance. Athlete is unable to stand."

For international para-alpine skiing competitions, classification is done through IPC Alpine Skiing. A national federation such as Alpine Canada handles classification for domestic competitions. For para-Nordic skiing events, classification is handled by IPC Nordic Skiing Technical Committee on the international level and by the national sports federation such as Cross-Country Canada on a country by country level. When being assessed into this classification, a number of things are considered including reviewing the skiers medical history and medical information on the skier's disability, having a physical and an in person assessment of the skier training or competing. During the assessment process, a testing board is used for this classification with six different tests being conducted that look for balance on different planes and to test for upper body strength and levels of mobility. The guideline scores for people to be assessed in this classification are 9 - 15.

=== LW11.5 ===
The IPC defines this class for para-Nordic skiing as for "with impairments in the lower limb(s) and the trunk. Athletes have near normal trunk muscles activation." Cross Country Canada defined this para-Nordic classification as "Impairment in the lower limbs and trunk. With good upper abdominal and trunk muscle activity and good sitting balance. Athlete may be able to stand" in 2012. Skiers in this class may be able to "stand or walk with or without aid of orthosis". They may also have Grade 2 or less hip extension.

== Equipment ==
In para-alpine skiing, the skier uses a mono-ski, which are required to have breaks on both sides of the ski. The chair can detach from a ski. Helmets are required for this class in para-alpine competition, with slalom helmets required for slalom and crash helmets required for the giant slalom. The para-Nordic sit-ski configuration has two skis. Skiers in this classification can use a sit-ski and outriggers, which are forearm crutches with a miniature ski on a rocker at the base. In the Biathlon, athletes with amputations can use a rifle support while shooting.

== Technique ==
LW11 classified Frederic Francois of France in action at the IPC Alpine World Championships in 2013

In learning to ski, one of the first skills learned is getting into and out of the ski, and how to position the body in the ski in order to maintain balance. The skier then learns how to fall and to get up. The skier then works with the instructor on learning to ski on flat terrain, with the purpose of this exercise being to learn how to use the outriggers. The skier next learns how to get into and out of a chairlift. After this, the skier learns how to make basic turns, edging, medium radius turns and advance skiing techniques.

Skiers use outriggers for balance and as leverage when they fall to right themselves. Outriggers are also used for turning, with the skier using the outrigger and their upper body by leaning into the direction they want to turn. In para-Nordic skiing, outriggers or ski poles are used top propel the skier forward. If a skier falls, they may require assistance in righting themselves to get back to the fall line. Doing this on their own, the skier needs to position their mono-ski facing uphill relative to the fall line.

In the Biathlon, all Paralympic athletes shoot from a prone position.

== Sport ==
A factoring system is used in the sport to allow different classes to compete against each other when there are too few individual competitors in one class in a competition. The factoring system works by having a number for each class based on their functional mobility or vision levels, where the results are calculated by multiplying the finish time by the factored number. The resulting number is the one used to determine the winner in events where the factor system is used. During the 1997/1998 ski season, the percentage for this para-Nordic classification was 93%. For the 2003/2004 para-Nordic skiing season, the percentage for was 93%. The percentage for the 2008/2009 and 2009/2010 ski seasons was 94% and 98% for LW11.5. The factoring for LW11 alpine skiing classification during the 2011/2012 skiing season was 0.785 for slalom, 0.8508 for giant slalom, 0.8324 for Super-G and 0.8333 for downhill. The percentage for the 2012/2013 para-Nordic season was 94% and for LWXI.5 was 98%.

In para-alpine events, this classification is grouped with sitting classes who are seeded to start after visually impaired classes and classes in the slalom and giant slalom. In downhill, Super-G and Super Combined, this same group competes after the visually impaired classes and before standing classes. A skier is allowed one push from the starting position at the start of a para-alpine race: no one is allowed to run while pushing them. In cross-country and biathlon events, this classification is grouped with other sitting classes. The IPC advises event organisers to run the men's sit-ski group first, and the women's sit-ski group section, with the visually impaired and standing skiers following. If the competitor skis off the course during a para-Nordic race, they may be assisted back onto the course where they left it by a race official. Skiers cannot use their legs to break or steer during the race.

Skiers in this class may injure themselves while skiing. Between 1994 and 2006, the German national para-alpine skiing team had three skiers in the LW11 class that had injuries while skiing. It occurred at the 1998 Winter Paralympics when the fell and extended their arm in abduction, which resulted in an Acromio-clavicular separation type Rockwood II. Another 1998 Paralympic skier had a Clavicula-Fracture. In 2003, a skier dislocated their shoulder. This class has a higher rate of "plexus brachialis distortion and a higher rate of shoulder injuries" compared to able bodied skiers.

== Events ==
This classification has been able to compete at different skiing competitions. At the 2002 Winter Paralympics in alpine-skiing, this classification was not grouped with others for the men's downhill, Giant Slalom, slalom and Super-G events while the women were grouped with LW10 and LW12 for their events with the exception of the Giant Slalom where they were only grouped with LW10. At the 2004 Alpine World Championships, LW10, LW11 and LW12 women competed against each other in a competition with factored results during the downhill event. At the 2005 IPC Nordic Skiing World Championships, this class was grouped with other sit-skiing classifications. In cross country, this class was eligible to compete in the men's 5 km, 10 km and 20 km individual race, with women eligible to compete in the 2.5 km, 5 km and 10 km individual races. In the men and women's biathlon, this classification was again grouped with sit-ski classes in the 7.4 km race with 2 shooting stages 12.5 km race which had four shooting stages. At the 2009 IPC Alpine World Championships, there were no women and thirteen men from this class the sitting downhill event.

== Competitors ==
Skiers in this class include Austrian Robert Frohle.
