= LW9 =

Paralympic skiing classification

LW9 is a Para alpine and Para Nordic standing skiing sport class, a classification defined by the International Paralympic Committee (IPC) for people with upper and lower limb function problems, and includes cerebral palsy skiers classified CP5, CP6 and CP7, along with people with hemiplegia or amputations. For international skiing competitions, classification is done through IPC Alpine Skiing or IPC Nordic Skiing. A national federation such as Alpine Canada handles classification for domestic competitions. This classification is separated into two subclasses including LW9.1 and LW9.2.

Para-Alpine skiers in this classification have their choice regarding how many skis and ski poles they wish to use, along with the type of ski poles they wish to utilize. In para-Nordic skiing, skiers use two skis and have an option to use one or two ski poles. Outriggers are one type of ski pole LW9 skiers can use which require alternative techniques. As there are a broad range of disabilities in this class, different skiing techniques are learned by competitors. Skiers missing an arm use a technique that corrects lateral balance issues resulting from the missing arm. Skiers with cerebral palsy have the introduction of ski poles delayed as skiers may overgrip them.

A factoring system is used in the sport to allow different classes to compete against each other when there are too few individual competitors in one class in a competition. During the 2011/2012 para-alpine ski season, the LW9.1 factoring was 0.855 for slalom, 0.8648 for giant slalom, 0.867 for super-G and 0.8769 for downhill, and for LW9.2 was 0.9287 for slalom, 0.9439 for giant slalom, 0.9443 for super-G and 0.9552 for downhill. In para-Nordic skiing, the percentage for the 2012/2013 ski season was 85-95% for classic and 82-96% for free. This classification has competed in its own separate events at the Paralympics and World Championships during the 1990s, but this changed during the 2000s. Skiers in this classification include Australian James Patterson, and French LW9.2 skier Solène Jambaqué.

== Definition ==
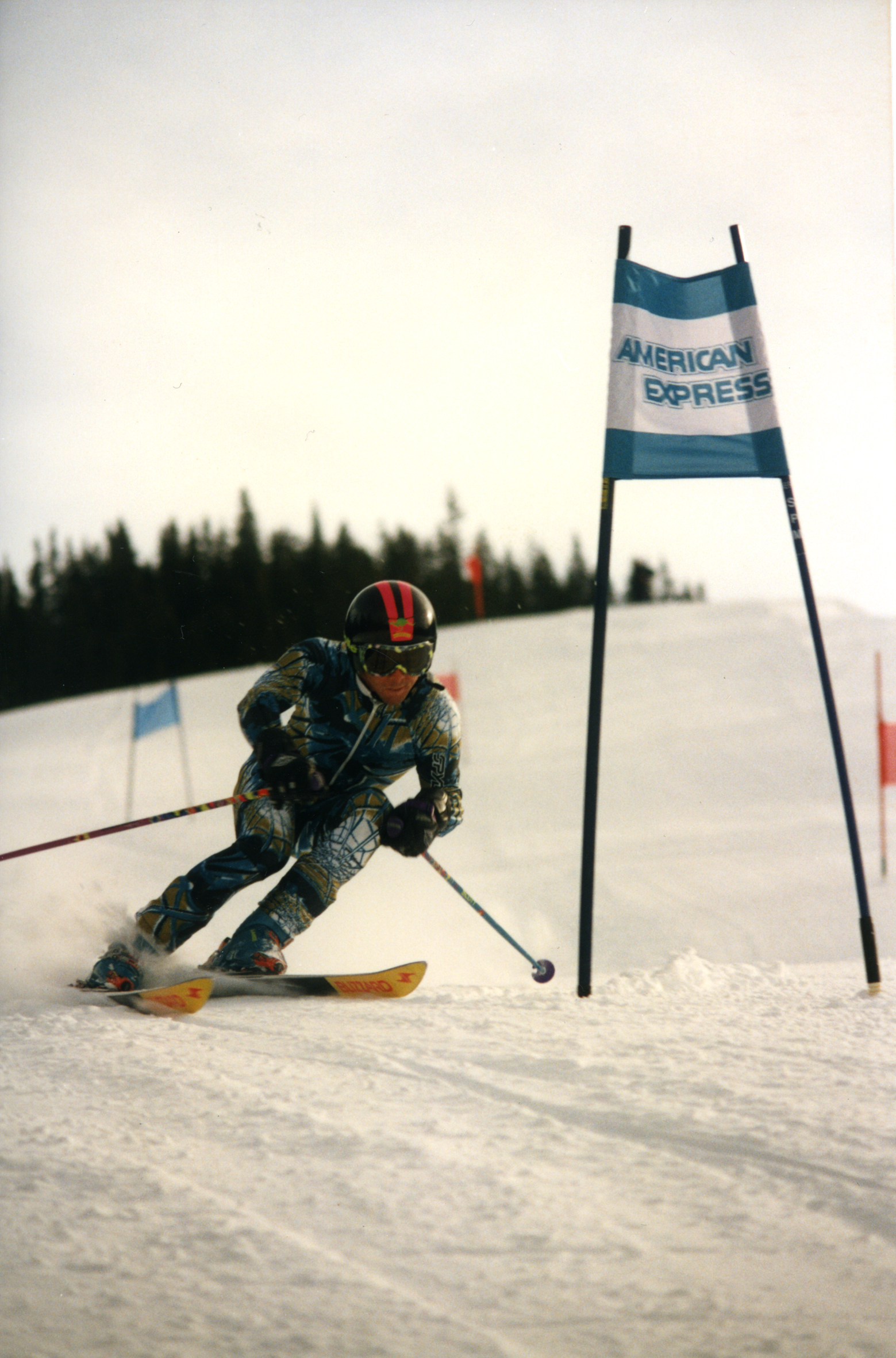
LW9 classified Australia skier James Patterson at the 1994 Winter Paralympics

This standing classification is used in para-alpine and para-Nordic skiing, where LW stands for Locomotor Winter. LW9 is a standing classification for people with upper and lower limb function problems. This classification is open for skiers with cerebral palsy or a similar neurological condition as long as it affects one leg and one arm.

The International Paralympic Committee (IPC) defined this classification for para-alpine as competitors typically having "one upper-limb and one lower-limb amputation skiing with the equipment of their choice." This classification has two subclasses, LW9.1 and LW9.2. In July 1997, at the World Cup Technical Meeting for para-alpine skiing, this class was subdivided into two classes in order to improve factoring for the range of disabilities found within the class at the time. In 2002, the Australian Paralympic Committee described this classification as a standing skiing classification with "Two skis, two poles, combination of disability in an arm and a leg."

For para-Nordic skiing, the IPC defines this class for "those with a combination of impairments in both the upper and lower extremities." Para-Nordic skiers in this class would be eligible for LW4 and LW8 based on the relevant upper and lower body disability. Cross Country Canada described this classification for para-Nordic as "A combination of impairment in both upper and lower extremities. Impairment in one arm and one leg meeting the criteria of LW4 and LW8, or cerebral palsy or neurological impairment that presents in a similar way to cerebral palsy affecting at least one arm and one leg."

For international para-alpine skiing competitions, classification is done through IPC Alpine Skiing. A national federation such as Alpine Canada handles classification for domestic competitions. For para-Nordic skiing events, classification is handled by IPC Nordic Skiing Technical Committee on the international level and by the national sports federation such as Cross-Country Canada on a country by country level. When being assessed into this classification, a number of things are considered including reviewing the skiers medical history and medical information on the skier's disability, having a physical and an in person assessment of the skier training or competing.

=== LW9.1 ===
LW9.1 is for people with upper extremity issues and above the knee amputation or similar problem with the issues and includes people classes CP7 who have severe hemiplegia. CP7 includes people with incomplete use of their fingers, wrists, and elbows, and is defined by the American College of Sports Medicine as "Involvement hemiplegic; walk/run with limp. Good function unaffected side." Hemoplegia is damage on one side of the brain that results in paralysis on the other side of the body.

=== LW9.2 ===
LW9.2 is for skiers with an upper extremity issue and below knee amputation or comparable disability; it includes people classes CP7 who have slight to moderate hemiplegia.

== Equipment ==
Para-alpine skiers in this classification have their choice regarding how many skis and ski poles they wish to use, along with the type of ski poles they wish to utilize, which may include outriggers. The rules FIS rules governing ski boots and bindings are not enforced for this class, with different requirements than rules that apply to that equipment for able-bodied competitors. For below the knee amputees in this class, their ski boot may have their prosthetic leg built into it. In para-Nordic skiing, skiers use two skis and have an option to use one or two ski poles.

Across both types of skiing, LW9 competitors use skis that would be slightly longer than if they were able-bodied. If they are using outriggers, these are fitted to the skier based the height of the skier's hip joint when the skier is standing. While learning to ski, skiers in this class with cerebral palsy may use ski-bras, bungi cords, outriggers, slant boards or toe boards. In the Biathlon, athletes with amputations can use a rifle support while shooting.

== Technique ==
LW9-2 classified French skier Solene Jambaque in action at the IPC Alpine World Championships in 2013

LW9-1 classified Martin France of Slovakia in action at the IPC Alpine World Championships in 2013

Outriggers are used to stop using a technique that involves bringing the skiers elbows from their raised position down to their hips while pushing the outriggers down. When using the outrigger, skiers do not rotate their arms as this changes the location of the ski on the snow.

Skiers missing an arm use a technique that corrects lateral balance issues resulting from the missing arm. A skier with an above the knee amputation may have a better ability to complete turns on the opposite of their amputation. Skiers with hemiplegia have to be trained to use both sides of their body equally. If they do not, they are likely to fall over when their skis cross in front of them.

One of the skiing techniques used by this class is called the three track method, and was developed as part of the American Training System. For skiers with an amputation, one of the first skills learned using this technique is how to walk with the ski so the skier can learn how to flex the ankle, knee and hip. This allows the skier to determine their centre of gravity. The skier is then taught how hop turn in order to understand arm and leg coordination while on skis. This technique is only used while stationary and is not a competition skill. The skier next learns how to fall down and get back up again. The next skill learned is climbing gentle terrain, followed by learning to go down a straight run and learning to stop. After this, the skier learns how to get on and off a ski lift. This is followed by learning how to traverse the fall line, which teaches the skier how to maintain the ski edge. Other skills are then taught including the Uphill Christie, beginning turns, parallel turns, short swings and moguls.

In teaching skiers with cerebral palsy, instructors are encouraged to delay the introduction ski poles as skiers may overgrip them. Use of a ski bra is also encouraged as it helps the skier learn correct knee and hip placement. One method of learning to ski for competitors with cerebral palsy in this classification is the American Teaching System. They first thing skiers learn is what their equipment is, and how to put it on and take it off. Next, skiers learn about positioning their body in a standing position on flat terrain. After this, the skier learns how to side step, and then how to fall down and get back up again. The skier then learns how to do a straight run, and then is taught how to get on and off the chair lift. This is followed by learning wedge turns and weight transfers, wedge turns, wide track parallel turns, how to use ski poles, and advanced parallel turns.

In the Biathlon, all Paralympic athletes shoot from a prone position.

== Sport ==
A factoring system is used in the sport to allow different classes to compete against each other when there are too few individual competitors in one class in a competition. The factoring system works by having a number for each class based on their functional mobility or vision levels, where the results are calculated by multiplying the finish time by the factored number. The resulting number is the one used to determine the winner in events where the factor system is used. For the 2003/2004 para-Nordic skiing season, the percentage for LW9 using the classic technique was 85-95% and percentage for free was 82-95%. The percentage for the 2008/2009 and 2009/2010 ski seasons was 85-95% for classic and 82-96% for free technique. The factoring for LW9.0 alpine skiing classification during the 2011/2012 skiing season was 0.8366 for slalom, 0.8451 for Giant Slalom, 0.8477 for Super-G and 0.8573 for downhill. During the 2011/2012 para-alpine ski season, the LW9.1 factoring was 0.855 for slalom, 0.8648 for Giant Slalom, 0.867 for Super-G and 0.8769 for downhill, and for LW9.2 was 0.9287 for slalom, 0.9439 for Giant Slalom, 0.9443 for Super-G and 0.9552 for downhill. In para-Nordic skiing, the percentage for the 2012/2013 ski season was 85-95% for classic and 82-96% for free.

In para-alpine events, this classification is grouped with standing classes who are seeded to start after visually impaired classes and before sitting classes in the slalom and giant slalom. In downhill, Super-G and Super Combined, this same group competes after the visually impaired classes and sitting classes. For alpine events, a skier is required to have their ski poles or equivalent equipment planted in the snow in front of the starting position before the start of the race. In cross-country and biathlon events, this classification is grouped with other standing classes. The IPC advises event organisers to run the men's standing ski group after the blind men's group and before the blind women's group. Women's standing classes are advised to go last.

During competition, LW9 skiers cannot use a limb not in a ski for competitive advantage to gain speed or keep balance by putting it in the snow. If they do so, the rules state they will be disqualified from the event.

== Events ==
This classification has competed in its own separate events at the Paralympics and World Championships during the 1990s, but this changed during the 2000s. At the 1994 Winter Paralympics, events for this classification included the Downhill and Giant Slalom, and was not grouped with others for medal events in para-alpine. At the 1996 Disabled Alpine World Championships in Lech, Austria, medals were awarded for skiers in this class, who were not grouped with other skiers. The 1998 Winter Paralympics featured the same events as the 1994 Games, and the same class groupings. At the 2002 Winter Paralympics in alpine-skiing, LW3, LW5/7 and LW9 were grouped for the men's downhill, slalom, Giant Slalom and Super-G events. On the women's side of the para-alpine programme, LW3, LW4, LW6/8 and LW9 were grouped for the downhill and Super-G events, while LW3, LW4, and LW9 were grouped for the slalom and Giant Slalom events. At the 2004 World Championships, LW3, LW6/8 and LW9 classified women all skied in together during the downhill event. At the 2005 IPC Nordic Skiing World Championships, this class was grouped with other standing skiing classifications. In cross country, this class was eligible to compete in the men and women's 5 km, 10 km and 20 km individual race. In the men and women's biathlon, this classification was again grouped with standing classes in the 7.4 km race with 2 shooting stages 12.5 km race which had four shooting stages. At the 2009 World Championships, there were no women and six men from this class the standing downhill event.

== Competitors ==
Skiers in this classification include Australian James Patterson, French LW9.2 skier Solène Jambaqué, and 1998 New Zealander 2006 Winter Paralympian Matthew Butson.
