= LW12 =

Paralympic skiing classification

LW12 is a Para alpine and Para Nordic sit skiing sport class defined by the International Paralympic Committee (IPC). An LW12 skier needs to meet a minimum of one of several conditions including a single below knee but above ankle amputation, monoplegia that exhibits similar to below knee amputation, legs of different length where there is at least a 7 centimetres difference, combined muscle strength in the lower extremities less than 71. For international competitions, classification is done through IPC Alpine Skiing or IPC Nordic Skiing. For sub-international competitions, classification is done by a national federation such as Alpine Canada. For para-alpine, this class is subdivided into two subclasses.: LW12.1 and LW12.2. A new sit-skier competitor with only national classification will compete as LW12.2 in international competitions until they have been internationally classified.

In para-alpine skiing, the skier uses a mono-ski, while para-Nordic skiers use a two ski sit-ski. Skiers in this class use outriggers, and are required to wear special helmets for some para-alpine disciplines. In learning to ski, one of the first skills learned is getting into and out of the ski, and how to position the body in the ski in order to maintain balance. The skier then learns how to fall and to get up.

A factoring system is used in the sport to allow different classes to compete against each other when there are too few individual competitors in one class in a competition. The alpine skiing factoring during the 2011/2012 skiing season for LW12.1 was 0.8031 for slalom, 0.8608 for giant slalom, 0.8489 for super-G and 0.851 for downhill, and for LW12.2 was 0.8279 for slalom, 0.8708 for giant slalom, 0.8587 for super-G and 0.8605 for downhill. The percentage for the 2012/2013 para-Nordic ski season was 100%. This classification has been able to compete at different skiing competitions including the Paralympics, IPC Alpine World Championships and the IPC Nordic Skiing World Championships. Competitors in this class include Australians Michael Norton and David Munk, and American Russell Docker.

== Definition ==
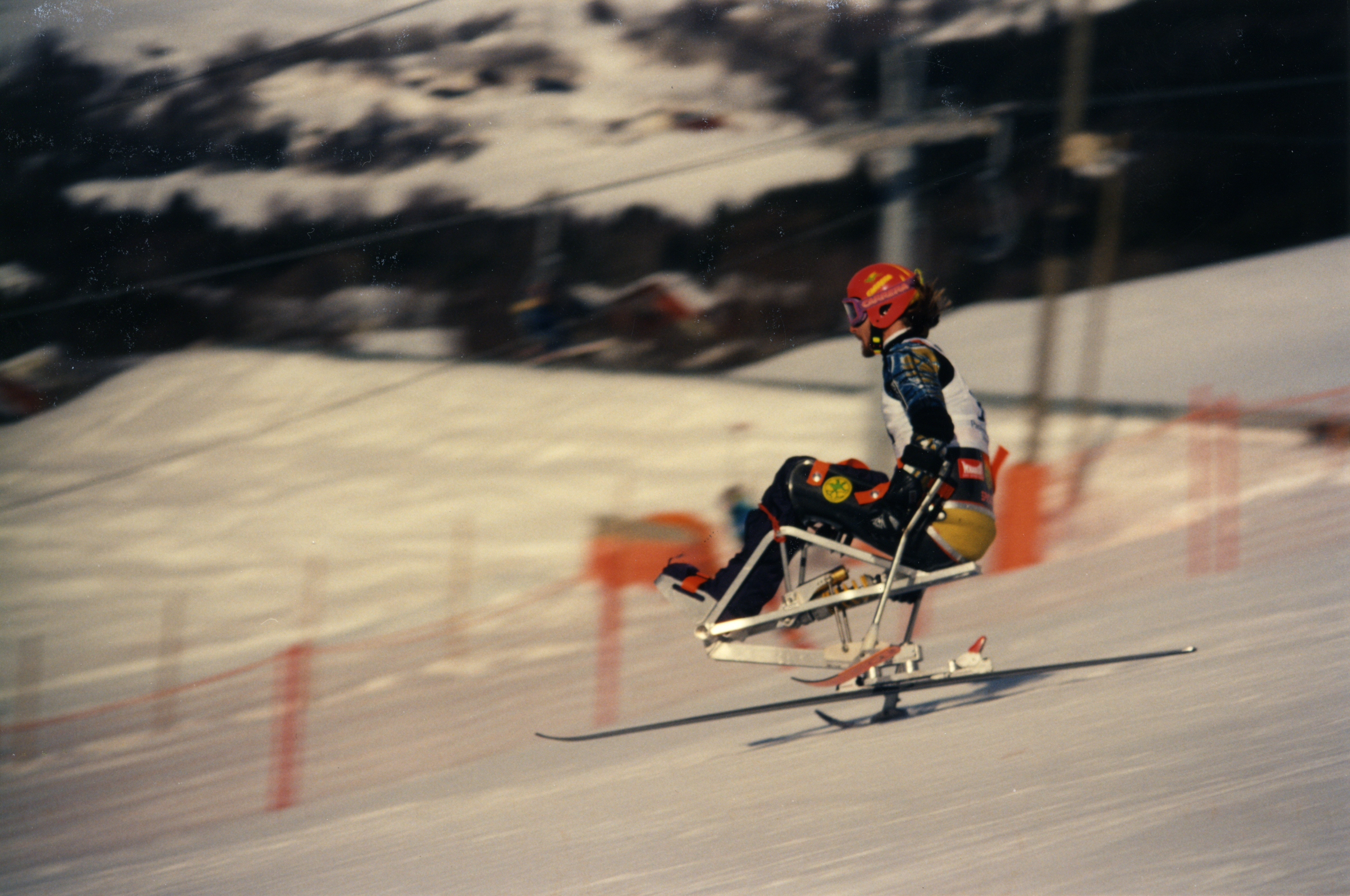
LW12 classified Australian skier David Munk at the 1994 Winter Paralympics

This is a para-alpine and para-Nordic sit-skiing classification, where LW stands for Locomotor Winter. To generally be eligible for a sit-skiing classification, a skier needs to meet a minimum of one of several conditions including a single below knee but above ankle amputation, monoplegia that exhibits similar to below knee amputation, legs of different length where there is at least a 7 centimetres (2.8 in) difference, combined muscle strength in the lower extremities less than 71. Skiers in this class "may have Grade 3-5 hip flexion and extension (unilateral or bilateral)". This classification is comparable to para classes 5 and 6. When not skiing, the competitor may be able to walk with or without the use of assisitive devices. This class is the equivalent of LW4, but skiers must choose to compete in LW4 or LW12: they cannot compete in both classifications during the same skiing season.

For para-alpine skiing, the Australian Paralympic Committee defined this classification as a sit skiing classification for "athletes with spinal injury or some other disability affecting the function in their lower limbs but they have good sitting balance." This classification is often subdivided into two separate categories for para-alpine skiing. In July 1997, at the World Cup Technical Meeting for para-alpine skiing, this classes was subdivided into two classes in order to improve factoring for the range of disabilities found within the class at the time.

The IPC defines this class for para-Nordic skiing as for "those with impairments in the lower limb(s) with normal trunk function." For the 1998 Winter Paralympics, the classification was defined for para-Nordic skiing as "Disability of the lower limbs and good sitting balance-Paraplegia and Standing classes with LW 1, 2, 3 and 4." Cross Country Canada defined this para-Nordic classification as "Impairments in the lower limb(s) with normal trunk function."

For international para-alpine skiing competitions, classification is done through International Paralympic Committee Alpine Skiing. A national federation such as Alpine Canada handles classification for domestic competitions. For para-Nordic skiing events, classification is handled by IPC Nordic Skiing Technical Committee on the international level and by the national sports federation such as Cross-Country Canada on a country by country level. When being assessed into this classification, a number of things are considered including reviewing the skiers medical history and medical information on the skier's disability, having a physical and an in person assessment of the skier training or competing. During the assessment process, a testing board is used for this classification with six different tests being conducted that look for balance on different planes and to test for upper body strength and levels of mobility. The guideline scores for people to be assessed in this classification are 16 - 18.

=== LW12.1 ===
LW12.1 skiers have a spinal cord injury. The IPC defined this para-alpine subclass as "athletes with spinal cord lesion with a function in the lower limbs and a good sitting balance". Adapted Physical Education and Sport defined this class as "Athletes with disabilities in the lower limbs, paraplegia only with good sitting balance; point score 16 to 18 points."

=== LW12.2 ===
LW12.2 skiers in this class have differences in between one limb and another. The IPC defined this para-alpine classification as "Athletes with amputations of the lower limbs." Adapted Physical Education and Sport described this class as "Athletes with disabilities in the lower limbs, amputations, and standing L classes L1, L2, L3/1, L3/2, L4, L9/2 with good sitting balance; point score 16 to 18 points." This classification is comparable to LW4 but for those who compete while sitting. A new sit-skier competitor with only national classification will compete as LW12.2 in international competitions until they have been internationally classified.

== Equipment ==
In para-alpine skiing, the skier uses a mono-ski, which are required to have breaks on both sides of the ski. The chair can detach from a ski. Helmets are required for this class in para-alpine competition, with slalom helmets required for slalom and crash helmets required for the giant slalom. The para-Nordic sit-ski configuration has two skis. Skiers in this classification can use a sit-ski and outriggers, which are forearm crutches with a miniature ski on a rocker at the base. In the Biathlon, athletes with amputations can use a rifle support while shooting.

== Technique ==
LW12-1 classified Austrian skier Roman Rabl in action at the IPC Alpine World Championships in 2013

LW12-2 classified American Stephani Victor in action at the IPC Alpine World Championships in 2013

In learning to ski, one of the first skills learned is getting into and out of the ski, and how to position the body in the ski in order to maintain balance. The skier then learns how to fall and to get up. The skier then works with the instructor on learning to ski on flat terrain, with the purpose of this exercise being to learn how to use the outriggers. The skier next learns how to get into and out of a chairlift. After this, the skier learns how to make basic turns, edging, medium radius turns and advance skiing techniques.

Skiers use outriggers for balance and as leverage when they fall to right themselves. Outriggers are also used for turning, with the skier using the outrigger and their upper body by leaning into the direction they want to turn. In para-Nordic skiing, outriggers or ski poles are used to propel the skier forward. If a skier falls, they may require assistance in righting themselves to get back to the fall line. Doing this on their own, the skier needs to position their mono-ski facing uphill relative to the fall line.

In the Biathlon, all Paralympic athletes shoot from a prone position.

== Sport ==
A factoring system is used in the sport to allow different classes to compete against each other when there are too few individual competitors in one class in a competition. The factoring system works by having a number for each class based on their functional mobility or vision levels, where the results are calculated by multiplying the finish time by the factored number. The resulting number is the one used to determine the winner in events where the factor system is used. During the 1997/1998 ski season, the percentage for this para-Nordic classification was 100% (a factor of 1.000). For the 2003/2004 para-Nordic skiing season, the percentage for was 100%. The percentage for the 2008/2009 and 2009/2010 ski seasons was 100%. The alpine skiing factoring during the 2011/2012 skiing season for LW12.1 was 0.8031 for slalom, 0.8608 for giant slalom, 0.8489 for Super-G and 0.851 for downhill, and for LW12.2 was 0.8279 for slalom, 0.8708 for giant slalom, 0.8587 for Super-G and 0.8605 for downhill. The percentage for the 2012/2013 para-Nordic ski season was 100%.

In para-alpine events, this classification is grouped with sitting classes who are seeded to start after visually impaired classes and classes in the slalom and giant slalom. In downhill, Super-G and Super Combined, this same group competes after the visually impaired classes and before standing classes. A skier is allowed one push from the starting position at the start of the race: no one is allowed to run while pushing them. In cross-country and biathlon events, this classification is grouped with other sitting classes. The IPC advises event organisers to run the men's sit-ski group first, and the women's sit-ski group section, with the visually impaired and standing skiers following. If the competitor skis off the course during a para-Nordic race, they may be assisted back onto the course where they left it by a race official. Skiers cannot use their legs to break or steer during the race.

Skiers in this class may injure themselves while skiing. Between 1994 and 2006, the German national para-alpine skiing team had a skier in the LW12 class that had an injury while skiing. The skier fractured their wrist at the 2002 Winter Paralympics. This class has a higher rate of "plexus brachialis distortion and a higher rate of shoulder injuries" compared to able bodied skiers.

== Events ==
This classification has been able to compete at different skiing competitions. At the 1992 Paralympics, included on the programme for the classification were the super-G and downhill disciplines. Slalom, giant slalom and super-G were included on the programme for the 1994 Winter Paralympics. At the 2002 Winter Paralympics in alpine-skiing, this classification was not grouped with others for the men's downhill, giant slalom, slalom, super-G medal events. On the women's side, this classification was not grouped with others for the women's giant slalom medal event, but it was grouped with LW11 and LW12 for the women's slalom and super-G. At the 2004 Alpine World Championships, LW10, LW11 and LW12 women competed against each other in a competition with factored results during the downhill event. At the 2005 IPC Nordic Skiing World Championships, this class was grouped with other sit-skiing classifications. In cross country, this class was eligible to compete in the men's 5 km, 10 km and 20 km individual race, with women eligible to compete in the 2.5 km, 5 km and 10 km individual races. In the men and women's biathlon, this classification was again grouped with sit-ski classes in the 7.4 km race with 2 shooting stages 12.5 km race which had four shooting stages. At the 2009 World Championships, there were three women from this class the sitting downhill event, two LW12.2 skiers and one LW12.1 skier. In the men's sitting downhill, there were six skiers from this class.

== Competitors ==
Competitors in this class include Australians Michael Norton and David Munk, American Russell Docker, and Spain's Óscar Espallargas.
