= LW2 =

Paralympic skiing classification

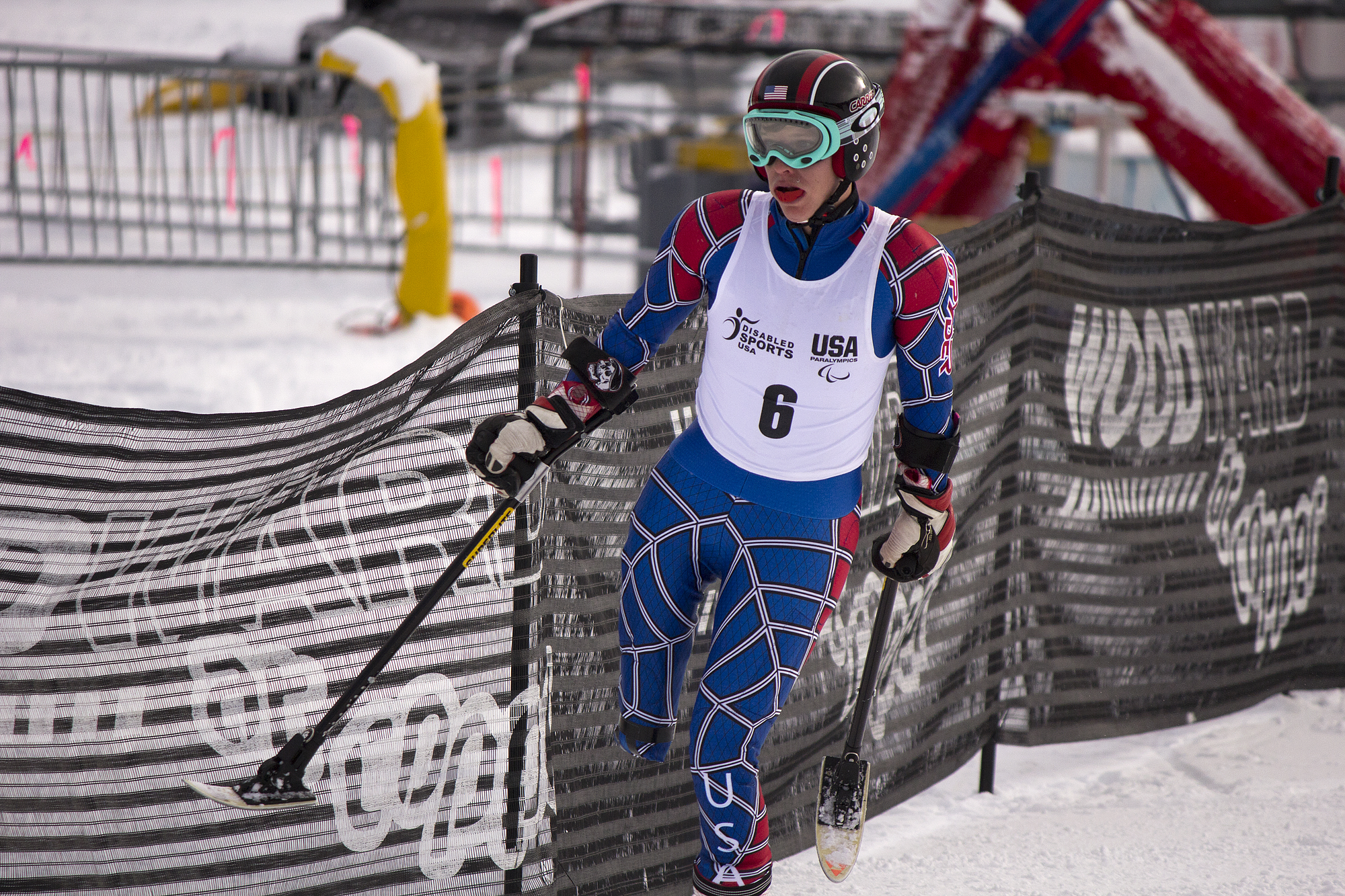
LW2 classified skier Allison Jones competing in the super-G at the 2012 Nor-Am Cup

LW2 is a Para alpine and Para Nordic standing ski sport class defined by the International Paralympic Committee (IPC). Competitors in this class have severe disability in a lower limb, which may be a result of an amputation, or arthrodesis in the leg and hip. Depending on the type of skiing, the international classification process for LW2 skiers is handled by the IPC Alpine Skiing Technical Committee and IPC Nordic Skiing Technical Committee. National sport federations handle classification on the lower levels.

In para-alpine, skiers use one ski and two ski poles while para-Nordic skiers use two skis and two ski poles. Other equipment may be used such as outriggers. Specific skiing and training techniques have been developed for this LW2 skiers that address their disability type and equipment use. A factoring system is used in both para-alpine and para-Nordic to allow different classes to compete against each other when there are too few individual competitors in one class in a competition. These factors may change from ski season to ski season.

This classification has been included in a number of medal events at major competitions since the 1980s. It was sometimes later grouped with other classes for medal events. Skiers in this sport class include Australians Michael Milton, Toby Kane and Cameron Rahles Rahbula, and American Allison Jones.

== Definition ==
This is a standing classification used in Para alpine skiing and Para Nordic skiing, where LW stands for Locomotor Winter. It is for people with a severe disability in a lower limb, which may be a result of an amputation, arthrodesis in the leg and hip, or a disease like polio. Competitors in this class would score 20 or less on a strength test for one leg. The International Paralympic Committee (IPC) explicitly defined this classification for para-alpine skiing as "Competitors with severe disabilities in one lower limb ... Typical disability profile of the class is single above-knee amputation." For para-Nordic skiing, the IPC defines this class as "those with impairment in one entire lower limb (involving pelvis structures distal)." In 2002, the Australian Paralympic Committee described this classification for para-alpine as a standing skiing classification with "One ski, two poles, disability in one leg above the knee." Cross Country Canada defined this classification for para-Nordic skiing as "Impairment in one entire lower limb (leg) involving pelvis and structures distal" in 2012.

For international para-alpine skiing competitions, classification is done through IPC Alpine Skiing Technical Committee. A national federation such as Alpine Canada handles classification for domestic competitions. For para-Nordic skiing events, classification is handled by IPC Nordic Skiing Technical Committee on the international level and by the national sports federation such as Cross-Country Canada on a country by country level. When being assessed into this sport class, a number of things are considered including reviewing the skiers medical history and medical information on the skier's disability, having a physical and an in person assessment of the skier training or competing.

== Equipment ==
In para-alpine, skiers in this classification compete with one skis and two ski poles. The para-alpine ski configuration is sometimes called a 3 track. FIS rules for para-alpine ski boots and binding heights are modified for this class from rules applied to able bodied competitor's equipment. In para-Nordic, skiers compete with two skis and two poles. Skiers use skis that would be slightly longer than if they were able bodied. Skiers in this classification may use outriggers. Outriggers are forearm crutches with a miniature ski on a rocker at the base, and are fitted for the skier based the height of the skier's hip joint when the skier is standing. In the biathlon, athletes with amputations can use a rifle support while shooting.

== Technique ==
LW2 classified Austrian skier Thomas Grochar in action at the IPC World Championships in 2013

One of the para-alpine skiing techniques used by this class is called the three track method, and was developed as part of the American training system. One of the first skills learned using this technique is how to walk with the ski so the skier can learn how to flex the ankle, knee and hip. This allows the skier to determine their centre of gravity. The skier is then taught how hop turn in order to understand arm and leg coordination while on skis. This technique is only used while stationary and is not a competition skill. The skier next learns how to fall down and get back up again. The next skill learned is climbing gentle terrain, followed by learning to go down a straight run and learning to stop. After this, the skier learns how to get on and off a ski lift. This is followed by learning how to traverse the fall line, which teaches the skier how to maintain the ski edge. Other skills are then taught including the Uphill Christie, beginning turns, parallel turns, short swings and moguls.

When falling, skiers in this class with above the knee amputations are taught to try to prevent the stump of their leg from hitting the snow as it can cause more damage to that leg than the one that is not partially missing. When working on side stepping, the skier is supported to keep the stump of their leg on the uphill side. Elite skiers are taught to avoid using outriggers as crutches. Skiers are taught to turn using their leg instead of their ski poles. Skiers in this class can use the outrigger to assist in maintaining their balance as they turn on the hill. A skier with an above the knee amputation may have a better ability to complete turns on the opposite of their amputation. In getting on ski lifts, skiers with above the knee amputations in this classification should lift their outriggers off the ground and point them forward.

When using the outrigger, skiers do not rotate their arms as this changes the location of the ski on the snow. Outriggers are used to stop using a technique that involves bringing the skiers elbows from their raised position down to their hips while pushing the outriggers down.

In the biathlon, all Paralympic athletes shoot from a prone position.

== Sport ==
A factoring system is used in the sport to allow different classes to compete against each other when there are too few individual competitors in one class in a competition. The factoring system works by having a number for each class based on their functional mobility or vision levels, where the results are calculated by multiplying the finish time by the factored number. The resulting number is the one used to determine the winner in events where the factor system is used. For the 2003/2004 para-Nordic skiing season, the percentage for the classic technique was 91% and percentage for free was 86-91%. The percentage for the 2008/2009 and 2009/2010 ski seasons was 91-93% for classic and 86-91% for the free technique. In para-Nordic skiing, the percentage for the 2012/2013 ski season was 91-93% for classic and 86-91% for free. For para-alpine skiers, during the 2005/2006 season, the giant slalom had a factor of 0.9184362 and men's slalom had a factor of 1.000. The factoring for LW2 alpine skiing classification during the 2011/2012 skiing season was 1 for slalom, 0.9211 for giant slalom, 0.9243 for super-G and 0.9426 for downhill.

In disability skiing events, sometimes this classification is grouped with standing classes who are seeded to start after visually impaired classes and before sitting classes in the slalom and giant slalom. In downhill, super-G, and super combined, this same group competes after the visually impaired classes and sitting classes. In cross-country and biathlon events, this classification is grouped with other standing classes. The IPC advises event organisers to run the men's standing ski group after the blind men's group and before the blind women's group. Women's standing classes are advised to go last.

For alpine events, a skier is required to have their ski poles or equivalent equipment planted in the snow in front of the starting position before the start of the race. During competition, the para-alpine skier cannot use a limb not in a ski for competitive advantage to gain speed or keep balance by putting it in the snow. If they do so, they rules state they will be disqualified from the event.

Skiers in this class may injure themselves while skiing. Between 1994 and 2006, the German national para-alpine skiing team had four skiers in LW2 who had an injury while skiing. One injury occurred in 1996 and was an "injury of the Plexus brachialis." In 1998 at the Winter Paralympics, LW2 skier, Alexander Spitz, broke his leg in the downhill event. In 2000, a skier had a "distortion of the plexus brachialis and anterior luxation of the shoulder". In 2001, a skier had a "fracture shoulder tuberculum majus and anterior luxation". This class has a higher rate of "plexus brachialis distorsion and a higher rate of shoulder injuries" compared to able bodied skiers.

== Events ==
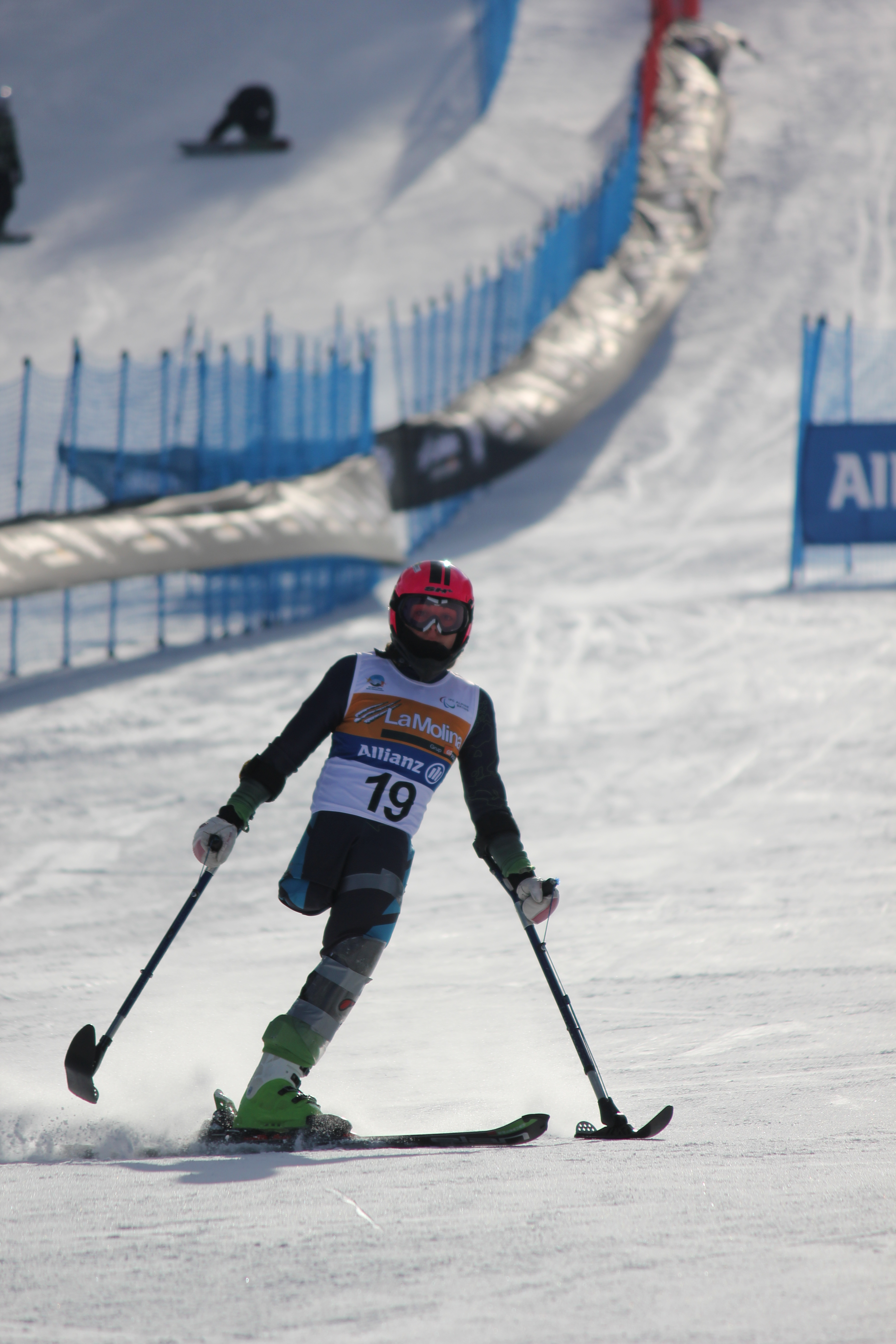
LW2 classified skier Úrsula Pueyo competing at the 2013 IPC Alpine World Championships

This classification has been included in a number of medal events at major competitions since the 1980s. It was sometimes later grouped with other classes for medal events. At the 1984 Winter Olympics Exhibition Competition, disciplines included on the programme were downhill and giant slalom, where it was not grouped with others for medal events for men and women. At the 1988 World Winter Games for the Disabled, disciplines represented included slalom, and the classification was not grouped with others for medal events for women. At the 1990 Disabled Alpine World Championships, LW2 skiers were in their own medal events. At the 1992 Winter Paralympics, this classification was eligible for the slalom and super-G events. At the 1994 Winter Paralympics, events for this classification included the giant slalom, downhill, super-G and slalom.

At the 2002 Winter Paralympics, disciplines for this classification were eligible for included the downhill, giant slalom, slalom and super-G. At the 2002 Winter Paralympics in alpine-skiing, this classification was not grouped with others for the men's giant slalom, super-G, and downhill events, and women's slalom, super-G, and downhill events. Two years later, at the 2004 World Championships, LW2 women had their own medal events in para-alpine for events including the downhill. At the 2005 IPC Nordic Skiing World Championships, this class was grouped with other standing skiing classifications. In cross country, this class was eligible to compete in the men and women's 5 km, 10 km and 20 km individual race. In the men and women's biathlon, this classification was again grouped with standing classes in the 7.4 km race with 2 shooting stages 12.5 km race which had four shooting stages. At the 2006 Winter Paralympics, events for this classification included the downhill and super-G. At the 2009 World Championships, this classification was grouped with other standing classes, with 3 of the 10 female skiers in the standing downhill event were from this class and the highest placed female finishing fifth. In the men's standing downhill, there were nine skiers from this class.

== Competitors ==
Skiers in this class include Australians Michael Milton, Toby Kane and Cameron Rahles Rahbula, American Allison Jones, and 1990 World Championships New Zealand competitor Lorraine Te Punga.
