= Para Nordic skiing classification =

Disability sport classification system

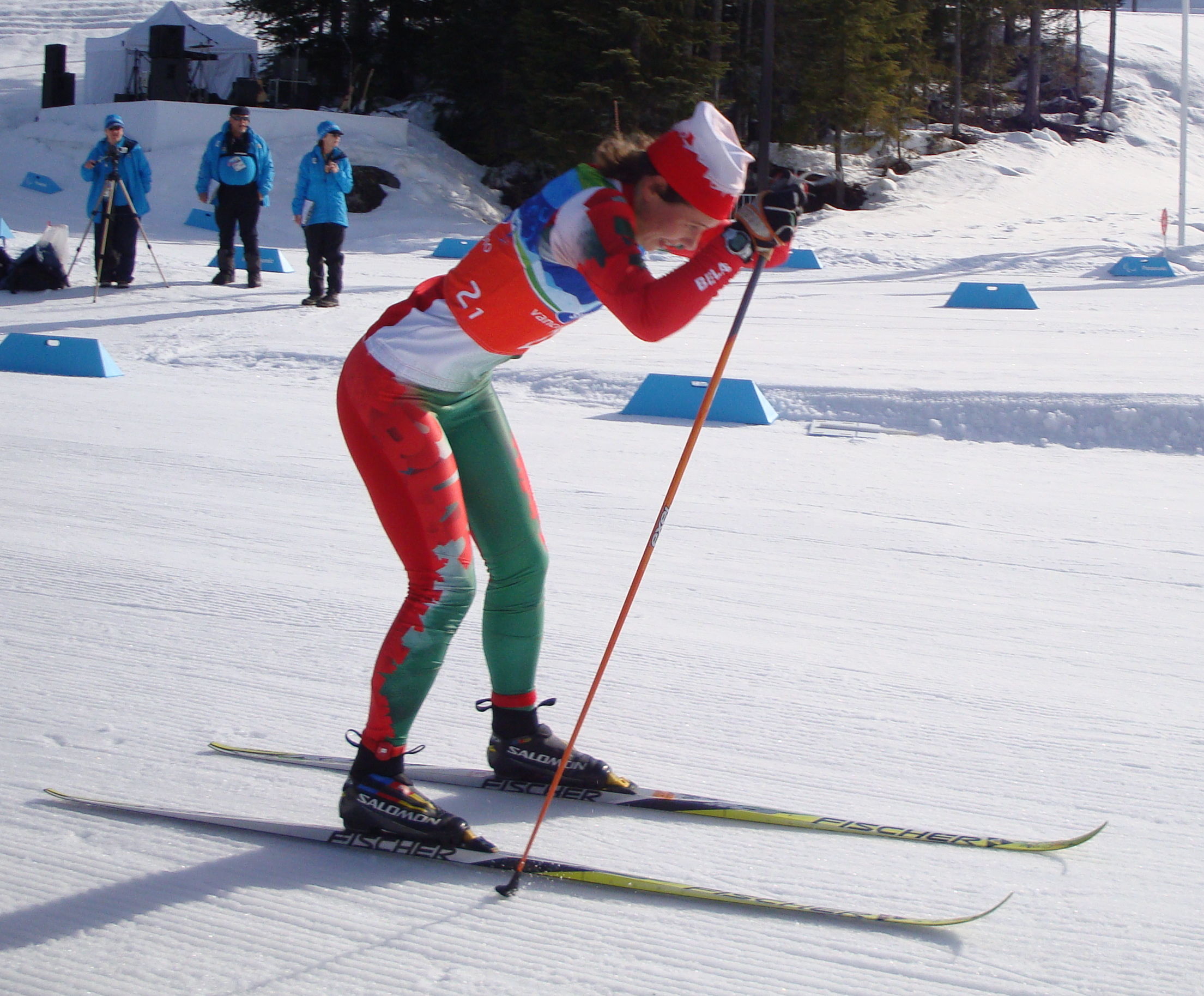
Larysa Varona of Belarus competing at the 2010 Winter Paralympics.

Para Nordic skiing classification is the classification system for Para Nordic skiing which includes the Para biathlon and Para cross-country skiing events. The classifications for Para Nordic skiing mirrors the classifications for Para alpine skiing with some exceptions. A functional mobility and medical classification is in use, with skiers being divided into three groups: standing skiers, sit skiers and visually impaired skiers. International classification is governed by International Paralympic Committee, Nordic Skiing (IPC-NS). Other classification is handled by national bodies. Before the IPC-NS took over classification, a number of organizations handled classification based on the type of disability.

The first classification system for the sport was developed in Scandinavia and was a medical system for skiers with amputations. At the time, other types of disability were not eligible for classification. In developing a system for use at the first Winter Paralympics, organisers wanted to get away from a medical classification system and use a functional system, but they ended up with a system based on equipment utilised by the skier instead. As the 1970s progressed, equipment improvements made it possible for skiers with spinal cord injuries to participate and a classification system developed for these skiers. By the 1990s, there were over ten Nordic skiing classes and a percentage system was developed to allow skiers with different disabilities inside one of three groups to compete against each other. The skiers time at the end of the race would be multiplied against a percentage to determine a time that allowed for fair cross classification comparisons. While the actual percentages change from time to time, this system to calculate a winner is still in use. Despite repeated efforts to move to a true functional mobility based classification dating back to the 1970s, medical assessment still took place during the classification process in the 2010s.

There are different events and equipment for different Para Nordic skiing classes. For sit-skiers, they use sit-skis with two skis, unlike Para alpine skiing where sit skiers use one ski. Blind skiers use a guide, with the position of the guide relative to the skier depending on the class of the skier. In the United States, Para Nordic skiing has events for people with intellectual disability that are run through Special Olympics. The classification process for blind Para Nordic skiing is handled internationally by the International Blind Sports Association and is a medical assessment. While National Paralympic Committees can classify their skiers for national competitions, this classification is subject to change at international competitions. These classifications have been used at the Winter Paralympics. Intellectual disability skiers were allowed to compete in full medal events at the 1998 Winter Paralympics but were subsequently removed because of cheating problems at the 2000 Summer Olympics.

== Definition ==
Para Nordic skiing has two events, the Para biathlon and Para cross-country skiing. The classifications for Para Nordic skiing at the same as classifications for Para alpine skiing, with the exception of the classifications for those with visual impairments. Classifications are based on functional mobility. For amputees, this is based on their mobility with the use of an assistive device. Classification for competitors with cerebral palsy is difficult because the levels of spasticity can change as the race progresses. People with cerebral palsy in classifications from CP1 to CP8 are covered by skiing classifications. Skiers from CP5 to CP8 compete standing up with the use of equipment. Since 1995, the classes area LW2, LW3, LW4, LW5/7, LW6, LW8, and LW9. There are three sit-ski classifications: LW10, LW11 and LW12, with LW10 being divided into LW10 and LW10.5, and LW11 being divided into LW11 and LW11.5. The sport also has three classifications for skiers with visual impairments: NS1, NS2, and NS3, based solely on medical classification; the classes B1, B2, and B3, are no longer used as of 2024. Research done at the Central Institute on Employment Abilities of the Handicapped in Moscow has found differences in functional capabilities based on differences in visual acuity. This plays a significant role in skiing.

Standing classes for athletes with physical impairment
Class	Description	Equipment
LW2	Impairment in one lower limb (through or above the knee)	Two skis, two poles
LW3	Impairments in both lower limbs	Two skis, two poles
LW4	Impairment in one lower limb (below the knee)	Two skis, two poles
LW5/7	Impairments in both upper limbs	Two skis, no poles
LW6	Impairment in one upper limb (through or above the elbow)	Two skis, one pole
LW8	Impairment in one upper limb (below the elbow)	Two skis, one pole
LW9	Impairment in one upper limb and one lower limb	Two skis, equipment of choice

Sitting classes for athletes with physical impairment
Class	Description
LW10	Impairments in both lower limbs (no sitting balance), score from 0–2 on the functional trunk/hip test
LW10.5	Impairments in both lower limbs (no sitting balance), score from 3–6 on the functional trunk/hip test
LW11	Impairments in both lower limbs (fair sitting balance), score from 7–10 on the functional trunk/hip test
LW11.5	Impairments in both lower limbs (fair sitting balance), score of 11 on the functional trunk/hip test
LW12	Impairments in both lower limbs (good sitting balance), score of 12 on the functional trunk/hip test

Classes for athletes with vision impairment
Class	Description	Equipment
NS1	Light perception without measurable visual acuity or no light perception	Guide and blackout glasses required
NS2	Visual acuity from LogMAR 2.3 – 3.5	Guide optional
NS3	Visual acuity from LogMAR 0.9 – 2.2 and/or binocular visual field of less than or equal to 60 degrees	Guide optional

== Governance ==
Para Nordic skiing is governed by the International Paralympic Committee, Nordic Skiing. The United States Deaf Ski and Snowboard Association is in charge of deaf classification for competitors in the United States. In the United States, the sport is governed by Disabled Sports USA for skiers with functional mobility, and governed by the United States Association of Blind Athletes (USABA) for skiers with vision impairment, while Special Olympics governs the sport and classification for people with intellectual disabilities. Disabled Sports USA developed its own classification system for sit skiing that is not used internationally. They use a three group classification system, with Group 1 skiers including T5 to T10 spinal cord injuries, Group 2 including all other skiers with disabilities below T10 and Group 3 including all spinal cord disabilities above T10.

In the sport's early history, the International Sports Organization for the Disabled (ISOD), founded in 1964, governed the sport. In 1980, there were two governing bodies handling classification, ISOD and the International Stoke Mandeville Games Committee (ISMGC), which later became the International Stoke Mandeville Games Federation (ISMGF), and still later the International Stoke Mandeville Wheelchair Sports Federation (ISMWSF). ISMGC was in charge of classification for athletes with spinal cord related disabilities. In 1981, the International Blind Sports Federation (IBSA) was created, and took over governance for skiers with visual impairments. In 2003, ISMWSF merged with ISOD, and changed its name to the International Wheelchair and Amputee Sports Federation (IWAS) in 2004. While the Cerebral Palsy International Sports and Recreation Association (CP-ISRA) has an interest in the sport because it is open to people with cerebral palsy, it is not governed by them. In 1983, both the rules for this sport, and classification, was done by the CP-ISRA. By 1984, there were four organisations governing classification for the sport: ISOD, ISMGF, IBSA and CP-ISRA.

== Eligibility ==
Currently, people with physical disabilities and vision impairment are eligible for classification. In 1983, Cerebral Palsy-International Sports and Recreation Association (CP-ISRA) set the eligibility rules for classification for this sport for people with cerebral palsy. They defined cerebral palsy as a non-progressive brain legion that results in impairment. People with cerebral palsy or non-progressive brain damage were eligible for classification by them. The organisation also dealt with classification for people with similar impairments. For their classification system, people with spina bifida were not eligible unless they also had evidence of upper motor neuron dysfunction, caused by associated hydrocephalus. People with cerebral palsy and epilepsy were eligible provided the condition did not interfere with their ability to compete. People who had strokes were eligible for classification following medical clearance. Competitors with multiple sclerosis, muscular dystrophy and arthrogryposis were not eligible for classification by CP-ISRA, but were eligible for classification by International Sports Organisation for the Disabled for the Games of Les Autres.

== History ==
Classification for winter sport started out as a medical one before moving to a functional system. The earliest classification systems for the sport were developed in Scandinavia. The original classification system was for people with amputations, with classification based on the type of amputation as determined by a medical expert. Other classes of disability were not eligible to be classified and compete early in the sport's history.

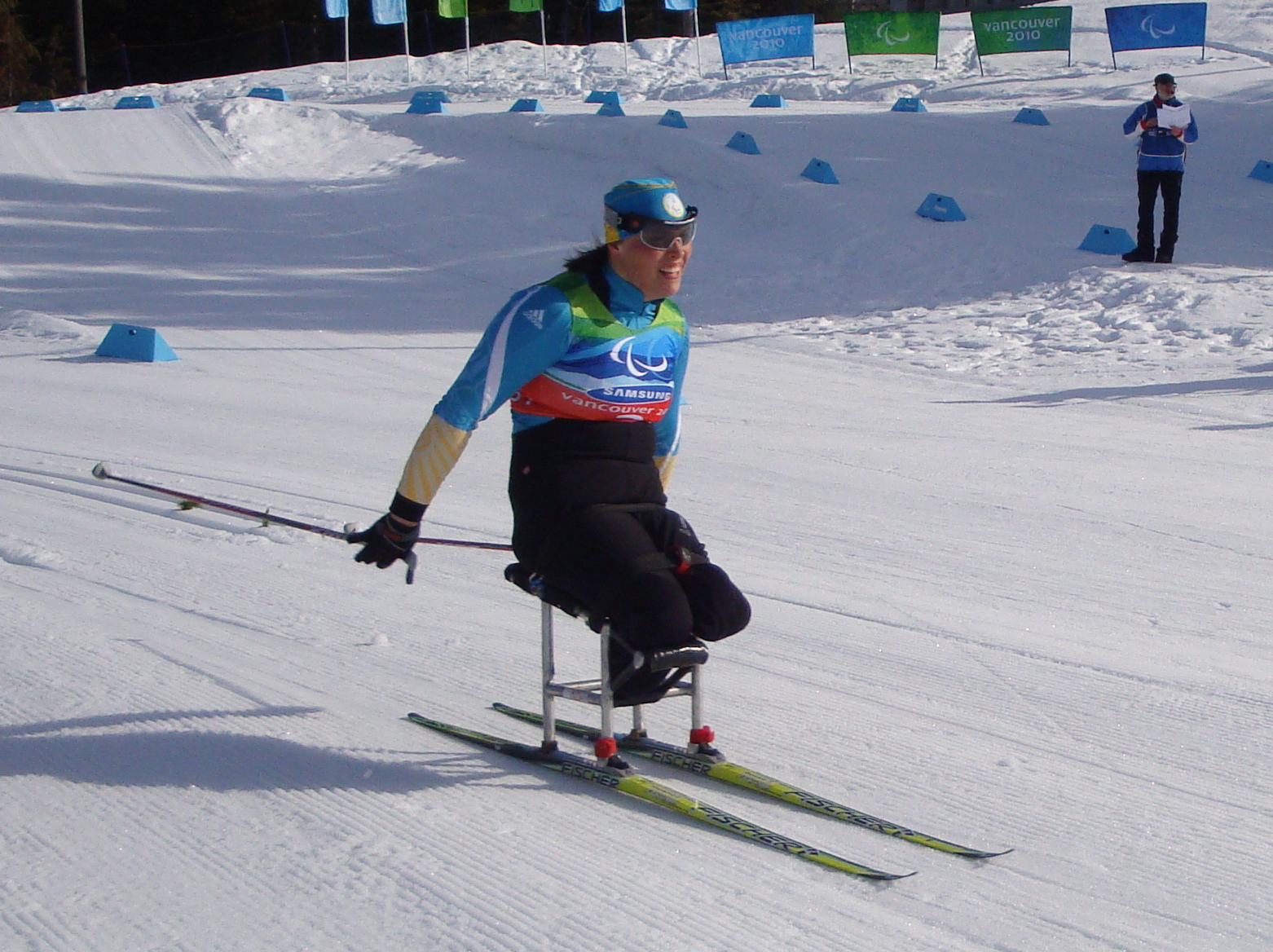
Olena Iurkovska of Ukraine competing on cross-country sit-skis at the 2010 Winter Paralympics.

Going into the first winter Paralympic Games, the 1976 Winter Paralympics, the organisers had a difference of opinion with Paralympic Games founder Ludwig Guttmann, because they wanted a functional classification, not medical classification system, from the onset. They largely succeeded, although the system that was developed in Örnsköldsvik, Sweden, that ended up being used was based on equipment utilised by the skier instead of a true functional classification system. During the 1970s, equipment was first being developed for skiers with spinal injuries and a classification system had yet to become fully developed for the sport.

In 1983, classification for cerebral palsy competitors in this sport was done by the Cerebral Palsy-International Sports and Recreation Association. The classification used the classification system designed for track events. In 1983, there were five cerebral palsy classifications. During the 1980s, there were three sit-ski classes and seven other classes. During the 1980s, while not formally part of the Para skiing classification system, intellectual disability Nordic skiing classes did exist as part of the Special Olympics movement. The sport was one sports people with disabilities were more likely to play during the 1990s.

Prior to 1988, the classification assessment process generally involved a medical exam to determine the classification. The change in winter disability sport classification towards a more formal functional classification system happened more quickly as a result of changes being made in wheelchair basketball classification that started in 1983. Prior to the 1988 Games, sit skiing was not included on the Paralympic programme. Norway worked to change this by added sit skiing classifications to the World Championships in 1986.

Functional classification testing was developed in 1989 for Nordic sit skiing, with the same system still being used for the 1998 Winter Paralympics. The tests included hand, arm and shoulder coordination, a sitting balance in the sagittal plane test, a stability sagittal plane test, a sitting balance test in the frontal planes, and a functional sitting ability test of the frontal and sagittal planes with an examination of sideways displacement.

By the 1990s, an integrated classification approach was tried in Nordic skiing had been developed using a percentage system that would allow for multiple classes to compete against each other in the same event using a formula to create a time finish that would enable fair comparisons for skiers of different functional ability. In 1997/1998, this was defined as 84% for LW10, 93% for LW11 and 100% for LW12. Their finishing time would then be multiplied against this percentage to determine where they finished. A variant of this system was still in place for the 2010 Winter Paralympics. The Canadian Paralympic Committee explains how this works with the following example: "Athlete A is classified as LW6 with a factor of 91% finishes the race in 1 minute, their final race time is 54.6 seconds. Athlete B is classified as LW5 with a factor of 79% finishes the race in 1 minute and 2 seconds, their final race time is 48.98 seconds. Athlete B wins. Therefore, the athlete who completed the race fastest may not be the winner and gold medalist." For the 2008 to 2010 ski seasons, the following percentages were used:

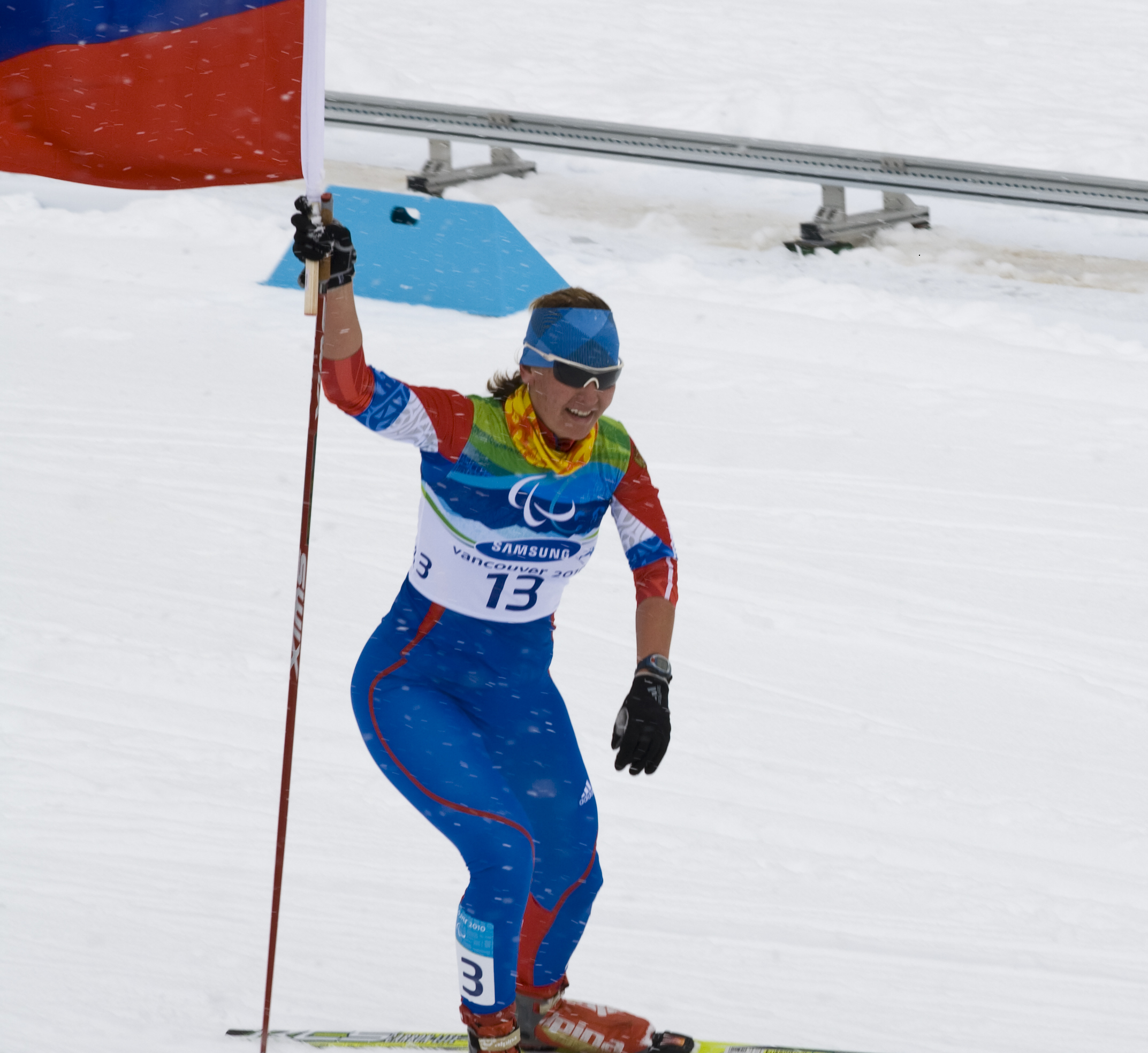
Anna Burmistrova of Russia celebrating winning the gold medal during the Women's 3km Pursuit Standing Biathlon at the 2010 Vancouver Winter Paralympics

Class	Classic	Free
B1	87%	85%
B2	98%	98%
B3	100%	100%
LW2	91–93%*	86–91%*
LW3	87–94%*	80–96%*
LW4	96%	96%
LW5/7	79%	87%
LW6	91%	96%
LW8	92%	97%
LW9	85–95%	82–96%

Class	Classic
LW10	86%
LW10,5	91%
LW11	94%
LW11,5	98%
LW12	100%

The move from a medical classification to a functional classification system continued during the 1990s. There were conversations about whether or not less-disabled wintersport athletes should be competing in disability winter sport and if they should instead be competing against able bodied competitors. At the same time, there were people including IPC first vice president Jens Bromann who entertained discussions about whether or not blind classifications should be combined into a single class like is done in some other disabilities sports. The debate about inclusion of competitors into able-bodied competitions was seen by some disability sport advocates like Horst Strokhkendl as a hindrance to the development of an independent classification system not based on the rules for able-bodied sport. These efforts ended by 1993 as the International Paralympic Committee tried to carve out its own identity and largely ceased efforts for inclusion of disability sport on the Olympic programme. Nonetheless, in 2006, skiers with amputation still had a medical component to their classification assessment.

The International Sports Federation for Persons with Intellectual Disability was given the task of re-evaluating the classification system for skiers with intellectual disabilities to prevent future abuses following the Spanish basketball team cheating scandal at the 2000 Summer Paralympics using a more reliable system that can be verified to classify competitors.

Starting 1 July 2024, a new classification system is used for athletes with visual impairments: NS1, NS2, and NS3 for Nordic skiing and AS1, AS2, AS3, and AS4 for alpine skiing. The visual tests remain the same, except they are done with both eyes open and the use of additional grating cards.

== Sport ==
Skiers with physical disabilities may compete on the same team as people with vision impairment in team events. This is the case in cross country relay events, where there needs to be one sit skier, one standing skier and one vision impaired skier. At the 2010 Winter Paralympics, the men's relay, named the 1 x 4 km + 2 x 5 km relay, a sit skier led off with a 4 kilometres (2.5 mi) leg, with the standing skier going second on a 5 kilometres (3.1 mi) leg and the vision impaired skier going last on a 5 kilometres (3.1 mi) leg. On the women's side, the event is called the 3 x 2.5 km event. Skiing in the same order, all three skiers ski 2.5 kilometres (1.6 mi). Sit skiers sit in a chair with two skis attached to it. Classification percentages for national competitions are not necessarily the same ones used for international competitions.

In the biathlon, sit skiers and standing skiers shot at a target that had a bullseye 1.5 centimetres (0.59 in) large while vision impairment classifications shot at a bullseye that was 2.8 centimetres (1.1 in) large. Vision impaired skiers have a sound system that helps them sight for shooting portions in the biathlon. The guide for B1 skiers generally skis behind the skier in order to maximize the ability of the skier to hear the guide. The guide tells the skier things like when weight should be shifted, elements coming up on the course, and how to position themselves to maximize the diagonal run of the course. Guides for B2 and B3 skiers often position themselves differently as the skiers have some vision, which means the things a guide assists with will be different from what is required of a skier who has almost no sight.

== Process ==
For skiers with a visual impairment, their classification is handled by the International Blind Sports Association. They are tested based on medical classification by an Ophthalmologist. In the 1990s, the classification assessment process for Nordic skiing had several components. One component was a test that looked at the ability of the skier to go up and down a hill. Another was a neurological test. In Canada, classification for blind skiers is handled by Canadian Blind Sports Association. Canadians seeking classification start the process by getting in touch with the organisation. Para Nordic skiing classification is handled by Canada Cross Country. For Australian competitors in this sport, the sport and classification is managed the national sport federation with support from the Australian Paralympic Committee. There are three types of classification available for Australian competitors: Provisional, national and international. The first is for club level competitions, the second for state and national competitions, and the third for international competitions. While a skier is first classified by their national Paralympic committee, their international classification may take place during their first World Cup event. A competitor may challenge their own classification or that of their fellow competitors.

== At the Paralympic Games ==
The 1976 Winter Paralympics were the first time classifications other than spinal cord injury classifications competed at the Paralympic Games. At these Games, there were only two classifications for this sport. The 1976 Winter Paralympics were the first time classifications other than spinal cord injury classifications competed at the Paralympic Games. The only event open to a classification for people with spinal paralysis at the 1980 Winter Paralympics was the cross country event . It was one of only two events in the whole Games for people with spinal paralysis.

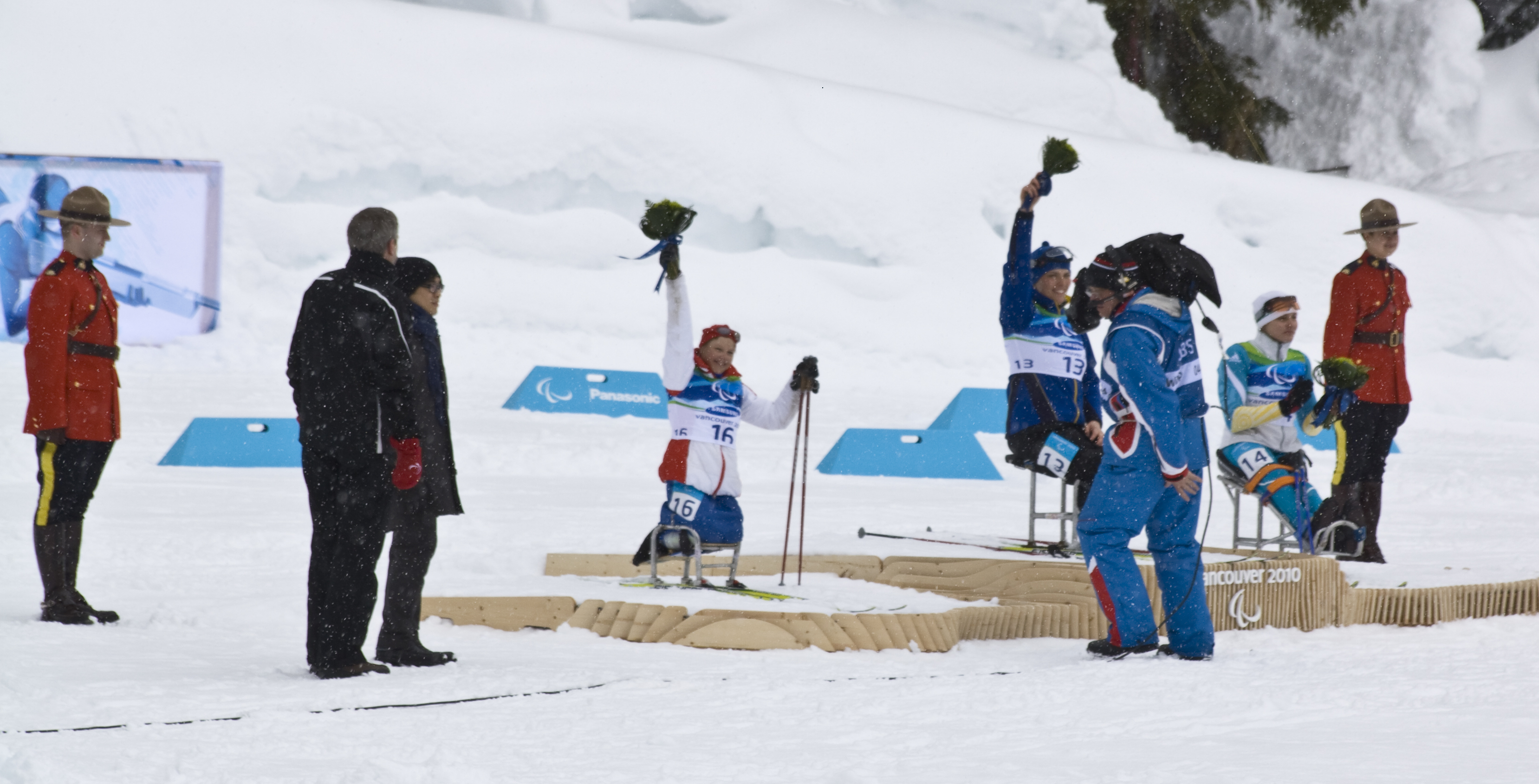
Women's 2.4km Pursuit Sitting Biathlon ceremony on Day 2 of the 2010 Vancouver Winter Paralympics at Whistler Paralympic Park on 13 March 2010, with Olena Iurkovska of Ukraine (gold), Maria Iovleva of Russia (silver), and Lyudmyla Pavlenko of Ukraine (bronze).

At the 1998 Winter Paralympics, skiers with intellectual disabilities were eligible to compete as full medal participants in the cross country event despite early initial opposition by the Nagano Organising Committee. The local organizers believed it would be too difficult to separate intellectual disability skiers into different classes. At the same time, there were few eligible skiers from Japan who would have been eligible to compete in these events.

At the 1992 Winter Paralympics, all disability types were eligible to participate, with classification being run through the International Paralympic Committee, with classification being done based on blind, amputee and sitting disability type. The biathlon was open to men with vision impairment classifications for the first time at the 1992 Games. At the 1992 Games, intellectual disability skiers competed in a demonstration event. At the 1992 Games, LW1 to LW9 competed in the short distances in a combined event, with LW 10 and 11 competing in their own short-distance event. Blind skiers all skied the short distances in a combined event. The 10 km event was open to LW1 to LW9, and H to D. The relay event was open to LW1 to LW9 in one event, and LWX and LWXI in another event, and blind skiing in a third event. The biathlon was open to women in blind classes for the first time at the 1994 Winter Paralympics.

Historically, Nordic skiing was the only skiing discipline open to competitors with intellectual disabilities, but their inclusion was suspended following the 2000 Summer Paralympics cheating scandal and they were not eligible to compete at the 2002 Winter Paralympics. At the 2002 Games, the cross country event had three groups of skiers: vision impaired, standing and sitting. In 2002, for the Winter Paralympics, the Games Classifiers were Birgitta Blomquist, Anne Lannem and Ted Fay. The Games Classifiers for vision impairment classifications were Roman Tolmatschev, Johan Wirsching and Axel Bolsinger. Classifications for skiers with intellectual disabilities were not included at these Games because of cheating that took place at the Sydney Summer Paralympics two years earlier.

== Future ==
Going forward, disability sport's major classification body, the International Paralympic Committee, is working on improving classification to be more of an evidence-based system as opposed to a performance-based system so as not to punish elite athletes whose performance makes them appear in a higher class alongside competitors who train less.
