= LW4 (classification) =

Paralympic skiing classification

LW4 is a Para alpine and Para Nordic standing skiing sport class defined by the International Paralympic Committee (IPC) for skiers who may have a disability in one lower extremity, which may be a result of a leg amputation below the knee, knee arthrodesis or a hip arthrodesis. For international skiing competitions, classification is done through IPC Alpine Skiing or IPC Nordic Skiing. A national federation such as Alpine Canada handles classification for domestic competitions.

Skiers in this classification compete with one or two skis and two ski poles, except in para-Nordic skiing where the skier must use two skis and two ski poles. Skiers in this sport class may have a specially made ski boot with a prosthetic built into it. Cerebral palsy skiers in this class may have better balance while using skis than they would otherwise. This presents challenges for coaches who are working with the skier. Compared to other skiers in the class, the skier with cerebral palsy may tire more quickly.

A factoring system is used in the sport to allow different classes to compete against each other when there are too few individual competitors in one class in a competition. The factoring for LW4 alpine skiing classification during the 2011/2012 skiing season was 0.9961 for slalom, 0.995 for giant slalom, 0.9901 for super-G and 0.9949 for downhill. In para-Nordic skiing, the percentage for the 2012/2013 ski season was 96% for classic and 96% for free. While LW4 was not grouped with others classes at an event in the 1980s, it became grouped with other classifications during the 1990s and 2000s. Eligible events for this classification included 1986 World Disabled Ski Championships, 1988 World Winter Games for the Disabled, 1990 Disabled Alpine World Championships, 1992 Winter Paralympics, 1994 Winter Paralympics, 1996 Disabled Alpine World Championships in Lech, Austria, 1998 Winter Paralympics and 2002 Winter Paralympics. Skiers in this classification include Australian Scott Adams and New Zealanders Steve Bayley and Patrick Cooper.

== Definition ==
This classification is used in para-alpine and para-Nordic standing skiing, where LW stands for Locomotor Winter. Skiers in this class have a disability in one lower extremity, which may be a result of a leg amputation below the knee, knee arthrodesis or a hip arthrodesis. If there are functional problems on the leg, the strength of the leg will be 30 or less, where a fully functional leg normally has a strength of 40. Lower limb monoplegia is a type disability that is comparable to knee amputation for this class. Skiers may be in this class as a result of an amputation, or polio.

The International Paralympic Committee (IPC) defined this classification for para-alpine as "Competitors with disabilities in a lower limb skiing with two normal skis and two poles ... Typical disability profile of the class is single below-knee amputation." While skiers with a fused knee and hip are eligible for this classification, skiers with fused ankles are not. In 2002, the Australian Paralympic Committee described this classification as a standing skiing classification with "Two skis, two poles, disability in one leg below the knee." For para-Nordic skiing, the IPC defines this classification as "those with impairment in one lower limb below the knee." Cross Country Canada described this classification as "Impairment in one lower limb below the knee."

For international para-alpine skiing competitions, classification is done through IPC Alpine Skiing. A national federation such as Alpine Canada handles classification for domestic competitions. For para-Nordic skiing events, classification is handled by IPC Nordic Skiing Technical Committee on the international level and by the national sports federation such as Cross-Country Canada on a country by country level. When being assessed into this classification, a number of things are considered including reviewing the skiers medical history and medical information on the skier's disability, having a physical and an in person assessment of the skier training or competing.

== Equipment ==
Skiers in this classification compete with one or two skis and two ski poles, except in para-Nordic skiing where the skier must use two skis and two ski poles. Skiers use skis that would be slightly longer than if they were able bodied. Skiing with a prosthesis is allowed in this classification in international competitions. In training, skiers can also use cants, wedges and prostheses with a special skiing prosthesis having been developed for use. The prosthetic may be built into the ski boot for below knee amputees, though FIS rules for ski boots and binding heights are enforced for everyone in this class.

Some skiers with amputations may require the use of outriggers, a forearm crutches with a miniature ski on a rocker at the base which are fitted for the skier based the height of the skier's hip joint when the skier is standing. Cants are wedges that sit under the binding that are intended to more evenly distribute weight. They are customised for the specific needs of the skier. Skiers in this class may have a specially made ski boot with a prosthetic built into it. In the Biathlon, athletes with amputations can use a rifle support while shooting.

== Technique ==
Outriggers are used to stop using a technique that involves bringing the skiers elbows from their raised position down to their hips while pushing the outriggers down. When using the outrigger, skiers do not rotate their arms as this changes the location of the ski on the snow. Skiers with below the knee amputations get on and off the ski lift using the same technique as able-bodied skiers. Cerebral palsy skiers in this class may have better balance while using skis than they would otherwise. This presents challenges for coaches who are working with the skier. Compared to other skiers in the class, the skier with cerebral palsy may tire more quickly.

One of the skiing techniques used by this class is called the three track method, and was developed as part of the American Training System. One of the first skills learned using this technique is how to walk with the ski so the skier can learn how to flex the ankle, knee and hip. This allows the skier to determine their centre of gravity. The skier is then taught how hop turn in order to understand arm and leg coordination while on skis. This technique is only used while stationary and is not a competition skill. The skier next learns how to fall down and get back up again. The next skill learned is climbing gentle terrain, followed by learning to go down a straight run and learning to stop. After this, the skier learns how to get on and off a ski lift. This is followed by learning how to traverse the fall line, which teaches the skier how to maintain the ski edge. Other skills are then taught including the Uphill Christie, beginning turns, parallel turns, short swings and moguls.

In Biathlon, all Paralympic athletes shoot from a prone position.

== Sport ==
A factoring system is used in the sport to allow different classes to compete against each other when there are too few individual competitors in one class in a competition. The factoring system works by having a number for each class based on their functional mobility or vision levels, where the results are calculated by multiplying the finish time by the factored number. The resulting number is the one used to determine the winner in events where the factor system is used.

In para-Nordic skiing, which includes cross-country skiing and biathlon events, this classification is grouped with other standing classes. For the 2003/2004 para-Nordic skiing season, the percentage for the classic technique was 94 or 96% and percentage for free was 96%. The percentage for the 2008/2009 and 2009/2010 ski seasons was 96% for classic and 96% for free technique. The factoring for LW4 alpine skiing classification during the 2011/2012 skiing season was 0.9961 for slalom, 0.995 for giant slalom, 0.9901 for super-G and 0.9949 for downhill. The percentage for the 2012/2013 ski season was 96% for classic and 96% for free.

In para-alpine skiing events, this classification is grouped with standing classes who are seeded to start after visually impaired classes and before sitting classes in the slalom and giant slalom. In downhill, super-G, and super combined, this same group competes after the visually impaired classes and sitting classes. A skier is required to have their ski poles or equivalent equipment planted in the snow in front of the starting position before the start of the race. The IPC advises event organisers to run the men's standing ski group after the blind men's group and before the blind women's group. Women's standing classes are advised to go last.

== Events ==
While LW4 was not grouped with others classes at an event in the 1980s, it became grouped with other classifications during the 1990s and 2000s. At the 1986 World Disabled Ski Championships, 1988 World Winter Games for the Disabled, 1990 Disabled Alpine World Championships, 1992 Winter Paralympics, 1994 Winter Paralympics, 1996 Disabled Alpine World Championships in Lech, Austria, 1998 Winter Paralympics and 2002 Winter Paralympics, the men's LW4 skiers were not grouped with others classes for medal events. For women at the 1998 Winter Paralympics, the LW1, LW3, LW4, LW5 and LW6 classes competed in one group. At the 2002 Winter Paralympics in alpine-skiing, women's LW3, LW4, LW6/8 and LW9 were grouped for the women's super-G and downhill events, and LW3, LW4, and LW9 were grouped for the Slalom and Giant Slalom events. At the 2005 IPC Nordic Skiing World Championships, this class was grouped with other standing skiing classifications. In cross country, this class was eligible to compete in the men and women's 5 km, 10 km and 20 km individual race. In the men and women's biathlon, this classification was again grouped with standing classes in the 7.4 km race with 2 shooting stages 12.5 km race which had four shooting stages. At the 2009 World Championships, there were no women from this class competing in the standing downhill event. In the men's standing downhill, there were five skiers from this class.

== Competitors ==
Skiers in this classification include Australian Scott Adams and New Zealanders Steve Bayley and Patrick Cooper.
