= LW10 =

Paralympic skiing classification

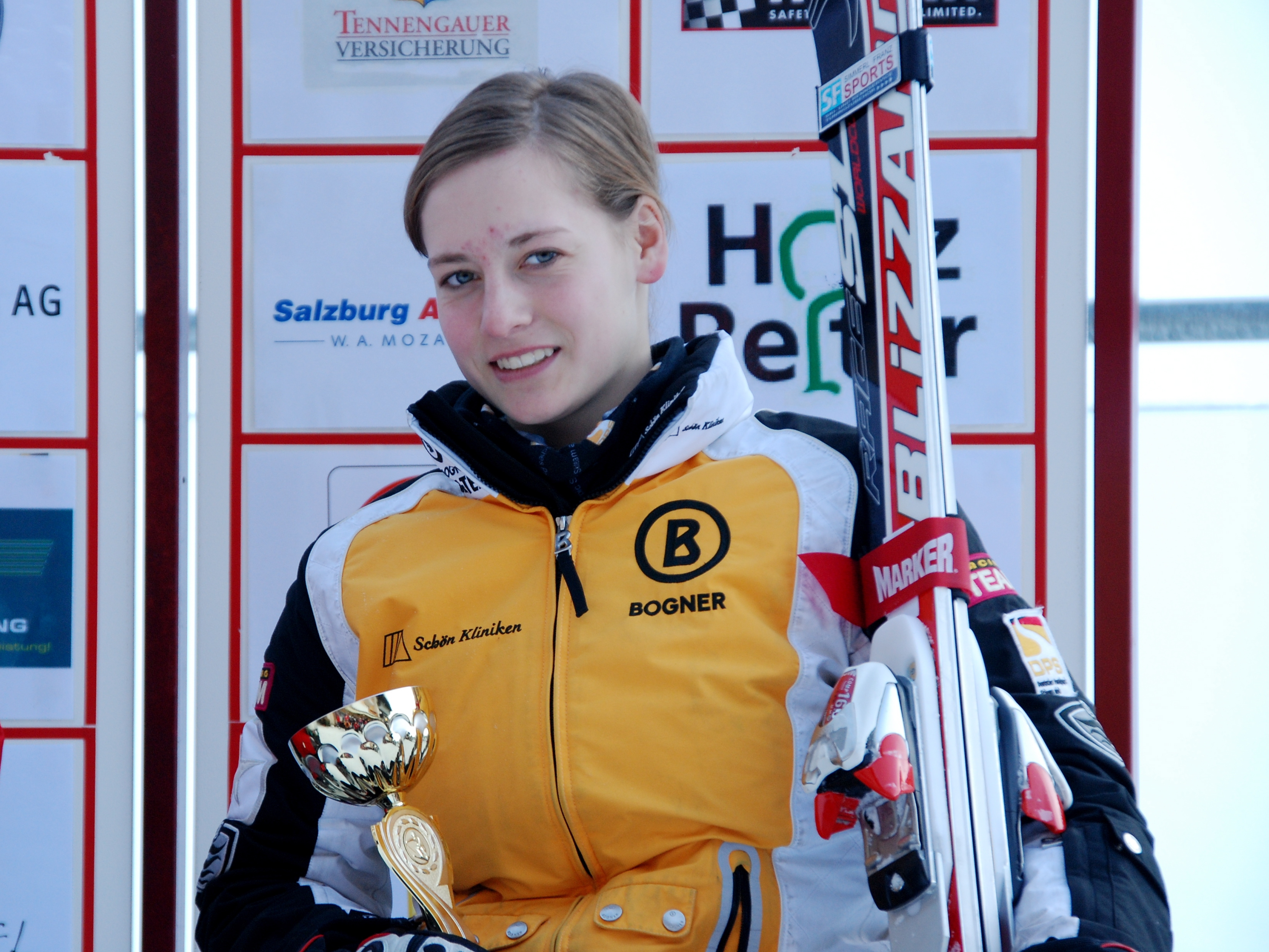
Germany's Anna Schaffelhuber is an LW10 para-alpine skier.

LW10 is a Para alpine and Para Nordic sit-skiing classification for skiers who cannot sit up without support. For international skiing competitions, classification is conducted by IPC Alpine Skiing and IPC Nordic Skiing, while national federations such as Alpine Canada handle classification for domestic competitions.

In para-alpine skiing, the skier uses a mono-ski, which is required to have breaks on both sides of the ski. The para-Nordic sit-ski configuration has two skis. Skiers in this class use outrigger skis for balance, as leverage to right themselves when they fall, and for turning. A factoring system is used in the sport to allow different classes to compete against each other when there are too few individual competitors in one class in a competition. Factoring for the 2011/2012 alpine ski season was done based on subclass, with LW10.1 factoring being 0.7234 for Slalom, 0.7794 for Giant slalom, 0.7942 for super-G and 0.8004 for downhill, and LW10.2 factoring being 0.7399 for slalom, 0.8152 for giant slalom, 0.8069 for super-G and 0.8183 for downhill. The percentage for the para-Nordic 2012/2013 ski season was 86% and for LW10.5 was 91%.

== Definition ==
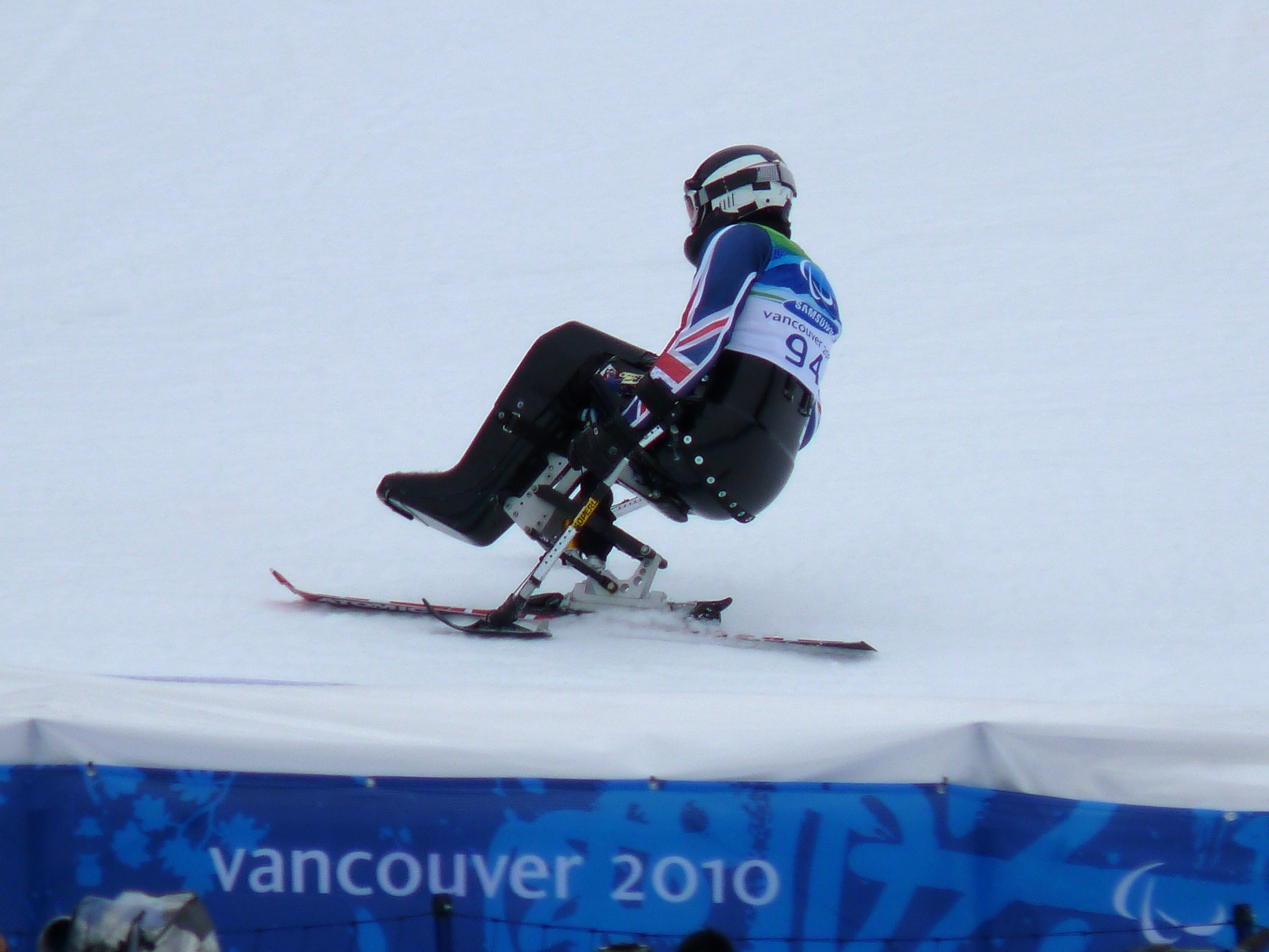
Britain's Talan Skeels-Piggins competes in the LW10 class at the 2010 Winter Paralympic Games in Vancouver

LW10 is a para-alpine and para-Nordic sit-skiing classification, where LW stands for Locomotor Winter. LW10 skiers cannot sit up without support, which includes people with cerebral palsy in all their limbs. Competitors in this class lack "buttock sensibility".

The IPC defined this para-alpine classification as "a. Disabilities in the lower limbs, no functional sitting balance. b. CP with disabilities in all four limbs (functional classification)." In 2002, the Australian Paralympic Committee defined this classification for para-alpine as a sit skiing classification for "Athletes with disabilities in the lower limbs and no sitting balance (i.e. Cannot sit upright without support)."

In para-Nordic skiing, the IPC defines this class as for "those with impairments in the lower limb(s) and the trunk." Cross Country Canada defines this para-Nordic classification as "Impairment in the lower limbs and trunk with minimal trunk muscle activity in flexion and extension and no functional sitting balance. [The] athlete is unable to stand." A skier in this class "will have minimal trunk muscle activity in flexion and extension so that the athlete is unable to maintain a sitting position against gravity while properly strapped to the test table and without arm support".

For international para-alpine skiing competitions, classification is done through IPC Alpine Skiing. A national federation such as Alpine Canada handles classification for domestic competitions. For para-Nordic skiing events, classification is handled by IPC Nordic Skiing Technical Committee on the international level and by the national sports federation such as Cross-Country Canada on a country by country level. A skier must meet a minimum of one of several conditions to be eligible for a sit-skiing classification. These conditions include a single below knee but above ankle amputation, monoplegia that exhibits similar to below knee amputation, legs of different length where there is at least a 7 centimetres (2.8 in) difference, and combined muscle strength in the lower extremities less than 71. Assessment for this classification includes consideration of the skier's medical history and disability, a physical examination, and an in-person assessment of the skier training or competing. During the assessment process, six different tests are conducted that look at the skier's balance on different planes, and test for upper body strength and levels of mobility. The guideline scores for people to be assessed in this classification are 0–8.

=== LW10.5 ===
Cross Country Canada defined this para-Nordic classification as "impairment in the lower limbs and trunk with some upper abdominal and trunk muscle activity and no functional sitting balance. [The] athlete is unable to stand". In para-Nordic skiing, LW10.5 is for sit skiers with disability affecting their lower extremities and trunk function, and who lack "buttock sensibility S1-S5".

== Equipment ==
In para-alpine skiing, the skier uses a monoski, which is required to have breaks on both sides of the ski. The chair can detach from a ski. Helmets are required in LW10 para-alpine competition; Slalom helmets for Slalom and crash helmets for the giant slalom. The para-Nordic sit-ski configuration has two skis. LW10 para-Nordic sit-skiers can use a sit-ski with outrigger skis, which are forearm crutches with a miniature ski on a rocker at the base. They sometimes use a quadriplegic ski, called a "Swing-Bo", which was designed to give the skier better steering, and rely less on outriggers. In the Biathlon, athletes with amputations can use a rifle support while shooting.

== Technique ==
Skiers use outriggers for balance and as leverage when they fall to right themselves. Outriggers are also used for turning; skiers use the outrigger and their upper body by leaning into the direction they want to turn. In para-Nordic skiing, outriggers or ski poles are used to propel the skier forward. If skiers fall, they may require assistance in righting themselves, and/or getting back to the fall line. Doing this on their own, they need to position their mono-ski facing uphill relative to the fall line.

In the Biathlon, all Paralympic athletes shoot from a prone position.

== Sport ==
A factoring system is used in para-alpine and para-Nordic skiing to allow different classes to compete against each other when there are too few individual competitors in one class. A number is given to each class of skiers based on their functional mobility or vision levels; the results are calculated by multiplying the finish time by the factored number. The resulting number is used to determine the winner in events where the factor system is used. During the 1997/1998 ski season, the percentage for this para-Nordic classification was 84%. For the 2003/2004 para-Nordic skiing season, the percentage for was 87%. The percentage for the 2008/2009 and 2009/2010 para-Nordic ski seasons was 86% and for LW10.5 was 91%. Factoring for the 2011/2012 alpine ski season was done based on subclass; LW10.1 factoring was 0.7234 for slalom, 0.7794 for giant slalom, 0.7942 for super-G and 0.8004 for downhill. LW10.2 factoring was 0.7399 for slalom, 0.8152 for giant slalom, 0.8069 for super-G and 0.8183 for downhill. The percentage for the para-Nordic 2012/2013 ski season was 86% and was 91% for LW10.5.

In para-alpine skiing events, LW10 skiers are grouped with sitting classes, who are seeded to start after visually impaired classes, and the classes in the slalom and giant slalom. In downhill, super-G and super combined, this group competes after the visually impaired classes and before standing classes. In cross-country and biathlon events, this classification is grouped with other sitting classes. The IPC advises event organisers to run the men's sit-ski group first, then the women's sit-ski group section, the visually impaired, and the standing skiers.

For alpine events, a skier is allowed one push, without running, from the starting position at the start of the race. If the competitor skis off the course during a para-Nordic race, a race official may assist him or her back onto the course. Skiers cannot use their legs to break or steer during the race.

Skiers in the LW10 class can injure themselves while skiing. Between 1994 and 2006, one skier in the LW10 class was injured on the German national para-alpine skiing team. He had a clavicle fracture in 2001, which corresponds to the higher rate of "plexus brachialis distortion and a higher rate of shoulder injuries" in the LW10 class compared to able bodied skiers.

== Events ==
At the 2002 Winter Paralympics in alpine-skiing, this classification was not grouped with others for the men's downhill, giant slalom, slalom and super-G events. At the 2002 Games, women skiers in the giant slalom, slalom, and super-G were grouped with LW11 and L12 for one medal event, and they were grouped with LW11 for the downhill event. At the 2004 Alpine World Championships, LW10, LW11 and LW12 women competed against each other in a competition with factored results during the downhill event. At the 2005 IPC Nordic Skiing World Championships, this class was grouped with other sit-skiing classifications. In cross country, this class was eligible to compete in the men's 5 km, 10 km and 20 km individual race, and women were eligible to compete in the 2.5 km, 5 km and 10 km individual races. In the men and women's biathlon, this classification was again grouped with sit-ski classes in the 7.4 km race with 2 shooting stages 12.5 km race, which had four shooting stages. At the 2009 Alpine World Championships, the class was grouped with other sitting classes, with four male (only one of whom finished) and one female LW10 skier competing in their respective downhill events.

== Competitors ==
Skiers in this classification include British skier Talan Skeels-Piggins, United States skier Chris Waddell, and Japan's Kuniko Obinata.
