= Para alpine skiing classification =

Designed to insure fair competition

Para alpine skiing classification is the classification system for Para alpine skiing, designed to ensure fair competition between alpine skiers with different types of disabilities. The classifications are grouped into three general disability types: standing, blind and sitting. Classification governance is handled by International Paralympic Committee Alpine Skiing. Prior to that, several sport governing bodies dealt with classification including the International Sports Organization for the Disabled (ISOD), International Stoke Mandeville Games Federation (ISMWSF), International Blind Sports Federation (IBSA) and Cerebral Palsy International Sports and Recreation Association (CP-ISRA). Some classification systems are governed by bodies other than International Paralympic Committee Alpine Skiing, such as the Special Olympics. The sport is open to all competitors with a visual or physical disability. It is not open to people with intellectual disabilities.

The first classification systems for Para alpine skiing were developed in Scandinavia in the 1960s, with early systems designed for skiers with amputations. At the time, equipment had yet to be developed to allow participation for skiers with spinal cord injuries. The goal of the early classification systems was to be functional but ended up being medical classification systems. At the first Winter Paralympics in 1976, there were two classifications for the sport. By the 1980s, classification existed for skiers with cerebral palsy. At that time, with inspiration from wheelchair basketball classification, efforts were made to make classification more of a functional system. Ten classes existed by the 1980s, and since then, efforts have been made to improve the efficiency of classification by reducing the number of classes so fewer medals can be rewarded.

Competition rules for classes use rules set by or modified from rules created by the International Ski Federation. For skiers with visual impairments, guides are used to assist the skier down the course. For standing skiers, different class rules determine what sort of equipment is allowed in competition, such as one pole, two poles or no poles, or one or two skis. Sit skiers use a specially designed ski called a mono-ski. Skiers are classified based on medical assessment, and their body position when they ski. Blind skiers are evaluated purely on a medical assessment.

== Definition ==
The Para alpine skiing classification system ensures fair competition in the sport by categorising skiers according to their functional mobility or vision impairment. Classification for amputees is based on their mobility with the use of an assistive device.

People with cerebral palsy in classifications from CP1 to CP8 are covered by skiing classifications. Skiers from CP5 to CP8 compete standing up with the use of equipment. The blind classifications are based on medical classification, not functional classification. In 1995, the classifications for skiing were LW1, LW2, LW3, LW4, LW5/7, LW6/8, and LW9, where LW stands for Locomotor Winter. There were three sit-ski classifications: LW10, LW11 and LW12. Classification for competitors with cerebral palsy is difficult because the levels of spasticity can change as the race progresses.

There are 9 standing classifications, on a gradient of most severe being LW1 and LW9 being the least severe. Sit skiing has three classifications, LW10, LW11 and LW12. These are grouped from the most severe at LW10 to least severe at LW12. LW10 have T5-T10 paraplegia.

In 2010, there were three vision impaired classifications, B1, B2 and B3. These classifications based on a gradient with B1 being the most severe and B3 being the least severe, with B3 skiers having vision around 2/60 to 6/60. Beyond the level of vision impairment, research done at the Central Institute on Employment Abilities of the Handicapped in Moscow has found differences in functional capabilities based on differences in visual acuity, which plays a significant role in skiing.

In 1997, one of the international alpine skiing classifiers was Mirre Kipfer. She said "Sometimes athletes try to cheat, to hide what they can really do. They are athletes who want to be in a class that is more advantageous to for them. In testing and classification they don't show what they can really do.They try to show that they are not able to do some movement, and that is why we have started functional testing." She goes on to say "The second problem is that when you have a very good athlete who is very well trained in the sport, you don't want to punish that person for their good performance. He or she might be an elite athlete doing a very good sport performance, and you might be tempted to say 'OK, he is doing so well he must be in another class.' We do try to get fewer classes so that we don't get, for example, 10 or 12 gold medals in alpine sports. We try to review the classes, but you always have borderline classes and it is always difficult. In winter the aim is to have three classes, like sitting, standing and blind: that is certainly the future that we are all looking to."

Standing classes
Class	Description	Typical equipment
LW 1	Double leg amputation above the knee, moderate to severe cerebral palsy, or equivalent impairment	Two skis, two outriggers
LW 2	Single leg amputation above the knee	One ski, two outriggers
LW 3	Double leg amputation below the knee, mild cerebral palsy, or equivalent impairment	Two skis, two poles
LW 4	Single leg amputation below the knee	Two skis, two poles
LW5/7-1	Double arm amputation above the elbow	Two skis, no poles
LW 5/7-2	Double arm amputation, one above and one below the elbow	Two skis, no poles
LW 5/7-3	Double arm amputation below the elbow	Two skis, no poles
LW6/8.1	Single arm amputation above the elbow	Two skis, one pole
LW 6/8.2	Single arm amputation below the elbow	Two skis, one pole
LW9.1	Amputation or equivalent impairment of one arm and one leg above the knee	Choice of equipment
LW9.2	Amputation or equivalent impairment of one arm and one leg below the knee	Choice of equipment

Sitting classes (monoskiers)
Class	Description
LW10.1	Paraplegia with no upper abdominal function and no functional sitting balance
LW 10.2	Paraplegia with some upper abdominal function and no functional sitting balance
LW11	Paraplegia with fair functional sitting balance
LW12.1	Paraplegia with some leg function and good sitting balance
LW 12.2	Double leg amputation above the knees

Visually impaired classes
Class	Description
B1	Totally blind
B2	Visual acuity of less than 2/60
B3	Visual acuity of 2/60 to 6/60

== Governance ==
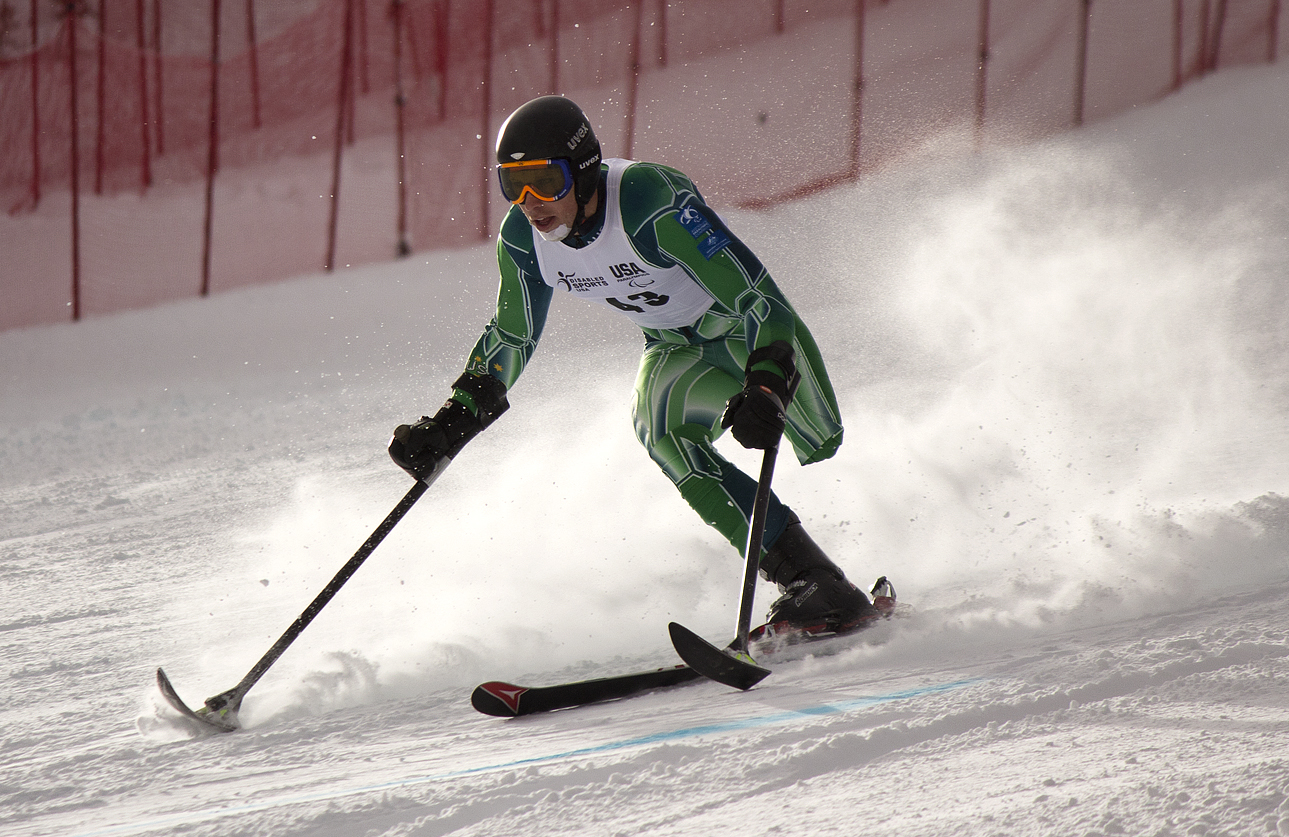
Australia's Cameron Rahles Rahbula competing in the Super G at the 2012 IPC Nor Am Cup at Copper Mountain, Colorado

Para alpine skiing is governed by the International Paralympic Committee Alpine Skiing. In the sport's early history, the International Sports Organization for the Disabled (ISOD), founded in 1964, governed the sport. In 1980, there were two governing bodies handling classification, ISOD and the International Stoke Mandeville Games Federation (ISMWSF). ISMWSF was in charge of classification for athletes with spinal cord related disabilities. In 1981, the International Blind Sports Federation (IBSA) was created, and took over governance for skiers with visual impairments. In 2003, ISMWSF merged with ISOD, and changed its name to the International Wheelchair and Amputee Sports Federation (IWAS) in 2004.

While the Cerebral Palsy International Sports and Recreation Association (CP-ISRA) has an interest in the sport because it is open to people with cerebral palsy, it is not governed by them. In 1983, the rules for this sport and approval for classification was done by the CP-ISRA, but in 2002, the rules governing the sport, including classification, were set by the 1994 IPC Handbook. In the United States, the sport is governed by Disabled Sports USA for skiers with functional mobility, and governed by the United States Association of Blind Athletes (USABA) for skiers with vision impairment, while Special Olympics governs the sport and classification for people with intellectual disabilities.

== Eligibility ==
The sport is open to all competitors with a visual or physical disability. It is not open to people with intellectual disabilities. In 1983, Cerebral Palsy-International Sports and Recreation Association (CP-ISRA) set the eligibility rules for classification for this sport. They defined cerebral palsy as a non-progressive brain lesion that results in impairment. People with cerebral palsy or non-progressive brain damage were eligible for classification by them. The organisation also dealt with classification for people with similar impairments. For their classification system, people with spina bifida were not eligible unless they had medical evidence of loco-motor dysfunction. People with cerebral palsy and epilepsy were eligible provided the condition did not interfere with their ability to compete. People who had strokes were eligible for classification following medical clearance. Competitors with multiple sclerosis, muscular dystrophy and arthrogryposis were not eligible for classification by CP-ISRA, but were eligible for classification by International Sports Organisation for the Disabled for the Games of Les Autres. The sport was not open to competitors with intellectual disabilities in 2002.

== History ==
The earliest classification systems for the sport were developed in Scandinavia. Classification for winter sport started out as a medical one before moving to a functional system. The original classification system was for amputees, with classification based on the type of amputation as determined by a medical expert. Other classes of disability were not eligible to compete. During the 1970s, equipment was developed for skiers with spinal injuries and a classification system had yet to become fully developed for the sport.

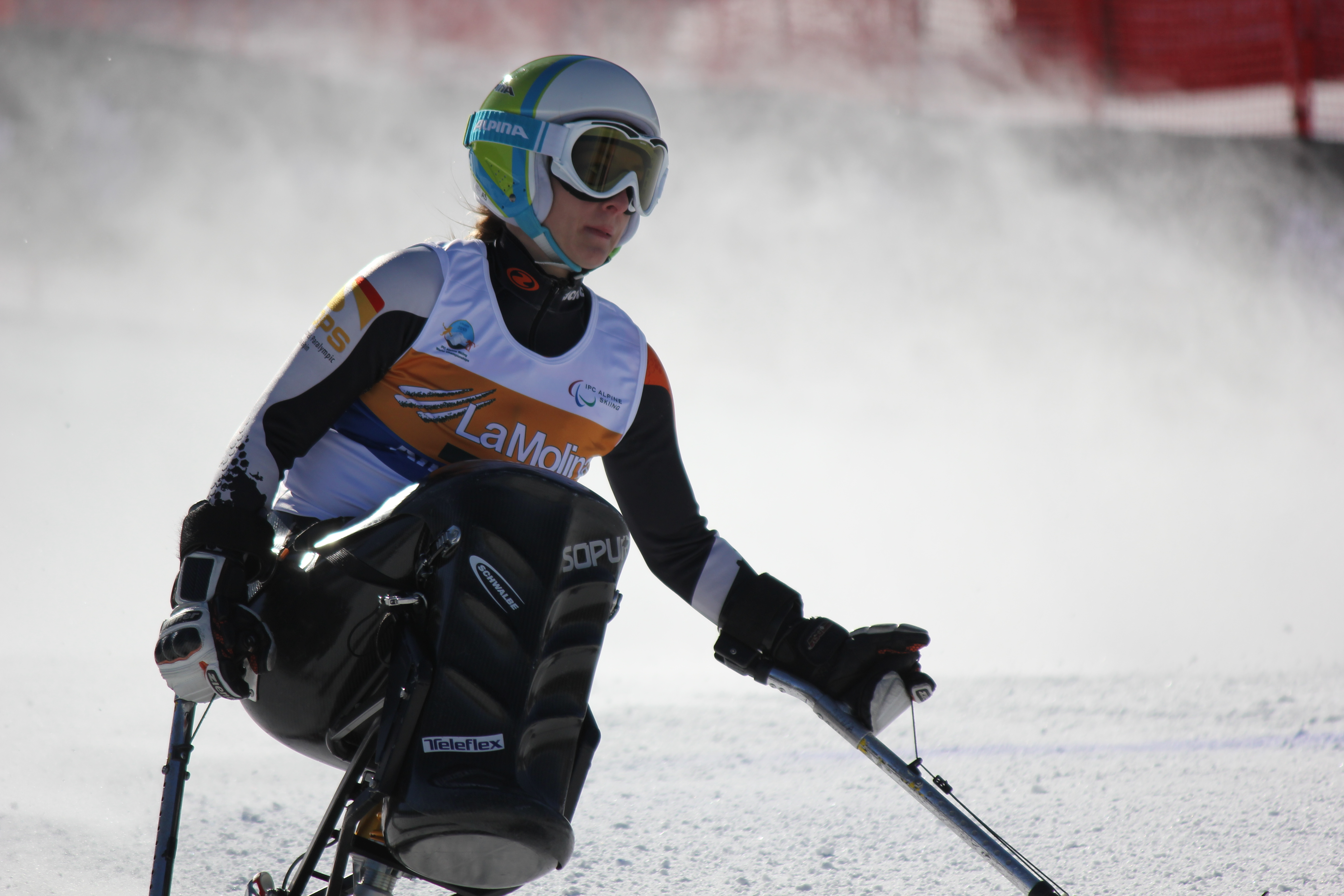
German sit skier Anna Schaffelhuber at the 2013 IPC Alpine World Championships in La Molina, Spain

Going into the first winter Paralympic Games, the 1976 Winter Paralympics, the organisers had a difference of opinion with Paralympic Games founder Ludwig Guttmann, because they wanted a functional classification, not medical classification system, from the onset. They largely succeeded, although the system that ended up being used was developed in Örnsköldsvik, Sweden, based on equipment utilised by the skier instead of a true functional classification system. The 1976 Winter Paralympics were the first time that classifications other than spinal cord injury classifications competed at the Paralympic Games. There were only two classifications for alpine skiing. One athlete from Austria with a spinal disability as a result of polio competed in an alpine event. He was able to ski from a standing position and competed against amputee skiers.

In 1983, classification for cerebral palsy competitors in alpine skiing was done by the Cerebral Palsy-International Sports and Recreation Association. The classification used the classification system designed for track events. There were five cerebral palsy classifications. During the 1980s, there were 3 sit-ski classes and 7 other classes. During the 1980s, while not formally part of the Para skiing classification system, intellectual disability alpine skiing events did exist as part of the Special Olympics programme.

By 1984, there were four organisations governing classification for the sport. They included ISOD, ISMGF, IBSA and CP-ISRA. In 1985, Swedish Brigitta Blomqwist, Swiss Andre Deville and Austrian Richard Altenberger began to develop a classification system for mono-skiing. Their classification system was put into use in competition in Innsbruck 1988. Prior to 1988, the classification assessment process generally involved a medical exam to determine the classification. The change in winter disability sport classification towards a more formal functional classification system happened more quickly as a result of changes being made in wheelchair basketball classification that started in using on 1983. Sit skiing was not included on the Paralympic programme. Norway worked to change this by adding sit-skiing classifications to the World Championships in 1986. The move from a medical classification to a functional classification system was still taking place during after the 1992 Summer Paralympics. Vision impaired, cerebral palsy and amputee classifications representing standing classifications were the only ones eligible for the Paralympics prior to the 1998 Winter Paralympics, when sit-ski classifications were added. By 2002, there were three vision impaired classifications.

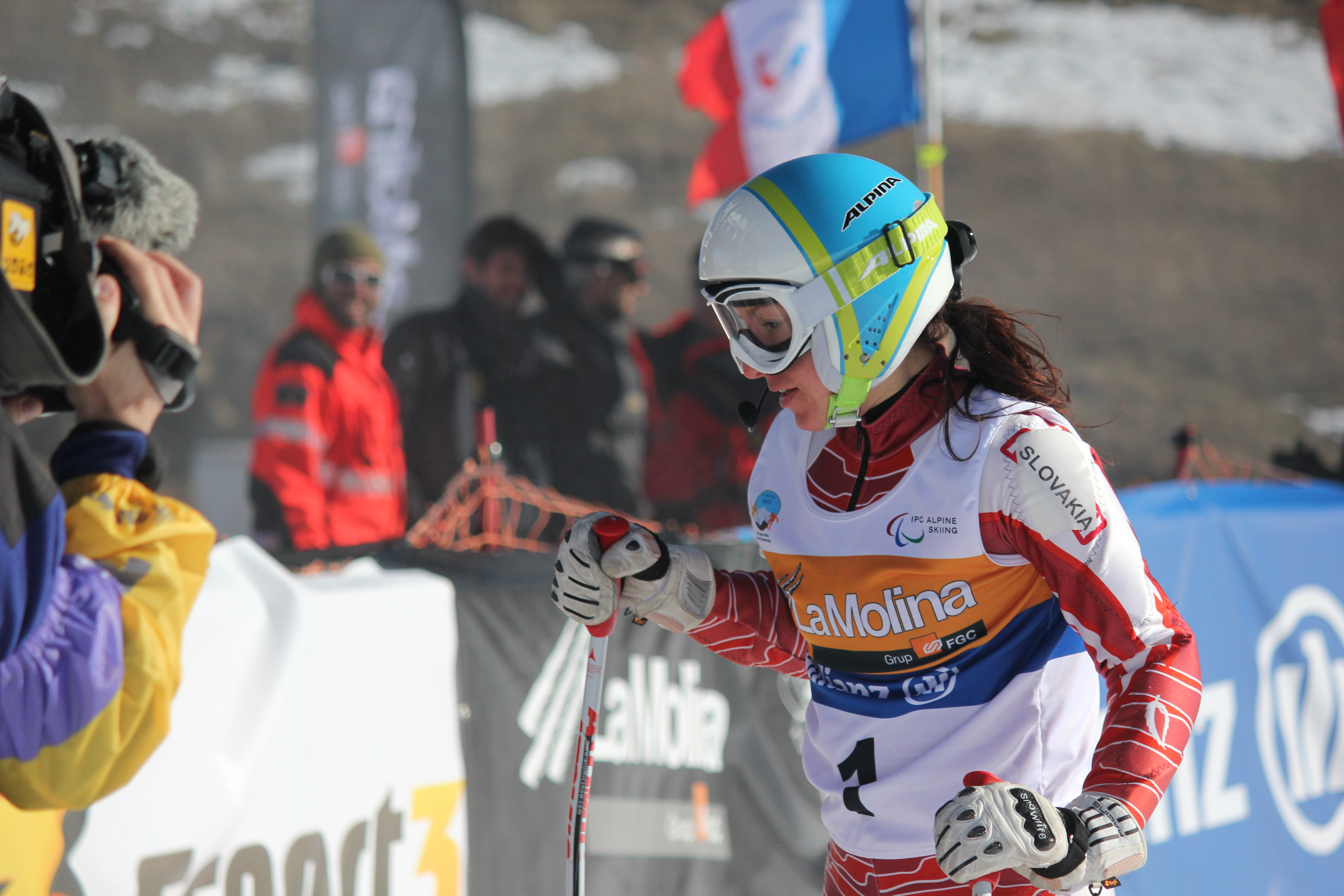
Henrieta Farkasova from Slovakia at the 2013 IPC Alpine World Championships in La Molina, Spain

For the 2002 Winter Paralympics, for the Winter Paralympics, the Games Classifiers were Mirre Kipfer, Bob Harney, Richard Altenberger and Dr. Ann-Sophie von Celsing. The Games Classifiers for vision impairment classifications were Roman Tolmatschev, Johan Wirsching and Axel Bolsinger. There were fourteen classifications for the sport, with four of them for sit-skiing, seven for standing and three for vision impairment. A factoring system was used when there were not enough competitors in a class and the classes had to be combined. This was modified at the 2006 Winter Paralympics, with skiers being grouped into three new categories based on a skiers functional ability: vision impaired, standing and sitting. The 14 classes still exist, but against these three groups with different classes having their results factored based on average historical performances inside that classification.

The debate about inclusion of competitors into able-bodied competitions was seen by some disability sport advocates like Horst Strokhkendl as a hindrance to the development of an independent classification system not based on the rules for able-bodied sport. At the time, sport administrators were trying to get disability skiing into able bodied competitions like the Olympics. These efforts ended by 1993 as the International Paralympic Committee tried to carve out its own identity and largely ceased efforts for inclusion of disability sport on the Olympic programme. The sport was one sports people with disabilities were more likely to participate in during the 1990s.

During the 1990s, there were conversations about whether or not less-disabled winter sport athletes should be competing in disability winter sport and if they should instead be competing against able bodied competitors. At the same time, there were people including IPC first vice president Jens Bromann who entertained discussions about whether or not blind classifications should be combined into a single class like is done in some other disabilities sports.

In 2006, skiers with amputation still had a medical component to their classification assessment. The three-group classification system, which utilized the Realistic Handicap Competition and Kreative Renn Ergebnis Kontrolle (RHC-KREK), was used for the first time at the Paralympics. The decision to use the RHC-KREK and limit it to medals for the three groups was made at the IPC Aline Skiing Sports Assembly in October 2004 in order to limit the number of potential medals being offered. It was implemented immediately for all IPC Paralympic Games and IPC World Championships. The system has been criticized because it relies on historical data from individual skiing competitors inside their own class, without taking into account conditions that could slow a skier such as temperature, visibility and precipitation.

Going forward, disability sport's major classification body, the International Paralympic Committee, is working on improving classification to be more of an evidence-based system as opposed to a performance-based system so as not to punish elite athletes whose performance makes them appear in a higher class alongside competitors who train less.

== Sports ==
Three classifications exist for skiers with visual disabilities. Vision impaired skiers generally follow the same rules as sighted skiers laid out by the International Ski Federation. The major difference is skiers in this group follow sighted guides who give the skiers vocal directions on where to ski. The guide for B1 skiers generally skis behind the skier in order to maximize the ability of the skier to hear the guide. The guide tells the skier things like when weight should be shifted, elements coming up on the course, and how to position themselves to maximize the diagonal run of the course. Guides for B2 and B3 skiers often position themselves differently as the skiers have some vision, which means the things a guide assists with will be different from what is required of a skier who has almost no sight.

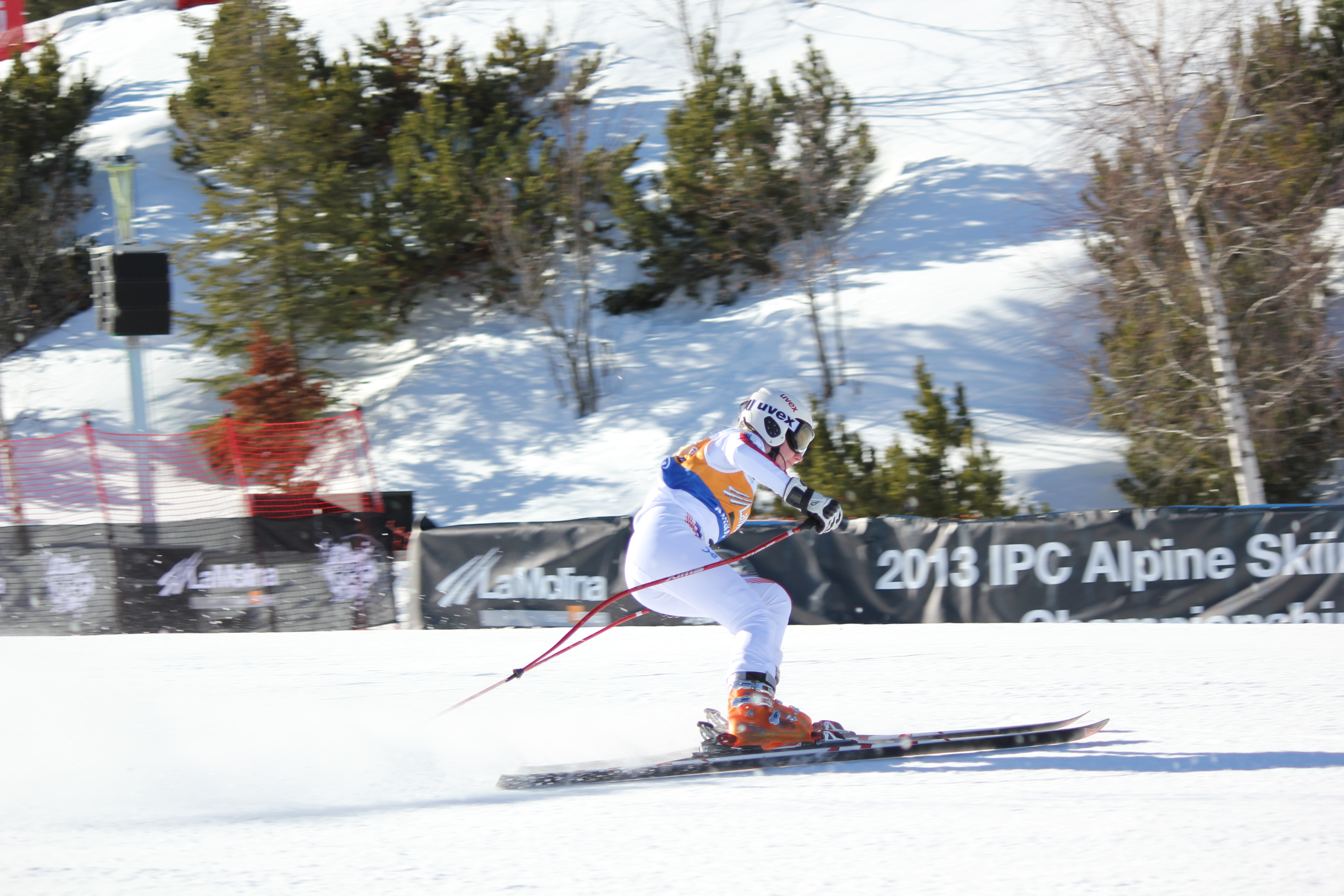
Alexandra Frantseva, a B2 skier from Russia at the 2013 IPC Alpine World Championships at La Molina in Spain

Standing skiers generally follow the same rules as sighted skiers laid out by the International Ski Federation. They may wear a prosthesis, use modified length ski poles, and/or use a ski pole called an outrigger that had a small ski on the end. LW1 skiers use two poles but may ski on one or two skis. LW2 skiers use one ski and two poles. LW3, LW4 skiers use two skis and two poles. LW5 and LW7 skiers do not use poles. LW6 and LW8 skiers use two ski and one pole.

Sit skiers generally follow the same rules as sighted skiers laid out by the International Ski Federation. They use a mono-ski, which has a specially fitted chair attached to the single ski. The skiers also use outrigger poles to aid in balance. The monoskis are sometimes called tubs or buckets. Wheelchair users are classified as sit-skiers.

Classifications were combined for one event in 2002 when there were fewer than six competitors in a single class. When classes are combined, a percentage system is used to determine the winner of a race. The Canadian Paralympic Committee explains how this works with the following example: "Athlete A is classified as LW6 with a factor of 91% finishes the race in 1 minute, their final race time is 54.6 seconds. Athlete B is classified as LW5 with a factor of 79% finishes the race in 1 minute and 2 seconds, their final race time is 48.98 seconds. Athlete B wins. Therefore, the athlete who completed the race fastest may not be the winner and gold medalist."

== Process ==
In general, classification for all Para alpine skiers looks at which equipment is utilized by a skier and their body position when they ski. Sit-skiers who are in the wheelchair group are assessed based on the residual muscle strength and level of spinal cord injury. For skiers with a visual impairment, their classification is handled by the International Blind Sports Association. They are tested based on medical classification by an ophthalmologist.

For Australian competitors in this sport, the sport and classification is managed the national sport federation with support from the Australian Paralympic Committee. There are three types of classification available for Australian competitors: provisional, national and international. The first is for club level competitions, the second for state and national competitions, and the third for international competitions.

== At the Paralympic Games ==
The sport was introduced at the first Winter Paralympics in 1976. At the 1988 Games, the Giant Slalom was an exhibition event for amputee classified skiers. At the 1992 Winter Paralympics, all disability types were eligible to participate, with classification being run through the International Paralympic Committee, with classification being done based on blind, amputee and sitting disability types. Downhill was open to the LW classification, the Super G had a blind event and an LW event, the Giant was open to blind and LW classes, and the slalom was open to the LW classification.

At the 2002 Winter Paralympics, the blind skiers skied first, followed by the sit skiing classified skiers, with the standing classes skiing last. Going into the Games, skiers had to have their classification recorded by a chief classifier by 14 February 2001, with the chief classifiers requiring to submit any amendments by 31 March 2001. This list was then sent to National Paralympic Committees (NPC) by 27 April 2001, with an ability to send in amendments again by 7 August 2001. Any discrepancies between the IPC list and NPC lists were reviewed in August 2001. A final master list for classifications was sent by the IPC to the NPCs on 7 September 2001. On 27 January 2002, the IPC sent a classification evaluation schedule to NPCs.

At the 2010 Winter Paralympics the LW5 and LW7 events were combined, as were LW6 and LW8 events. There were 25 men and 18 women in the downhill standing classes, 25 men and 10 women in the downhill sitting classes, and 12 men and 10 women in the downhill vision impaired classes. In the Super Combined, there were 18 men and 14 women in the standing event, 18 men and 10 women in the sitting classes, and 10 men and 10 women in the vision impaired classes.
