= Outrigger ski =

Skis used by para-skiers

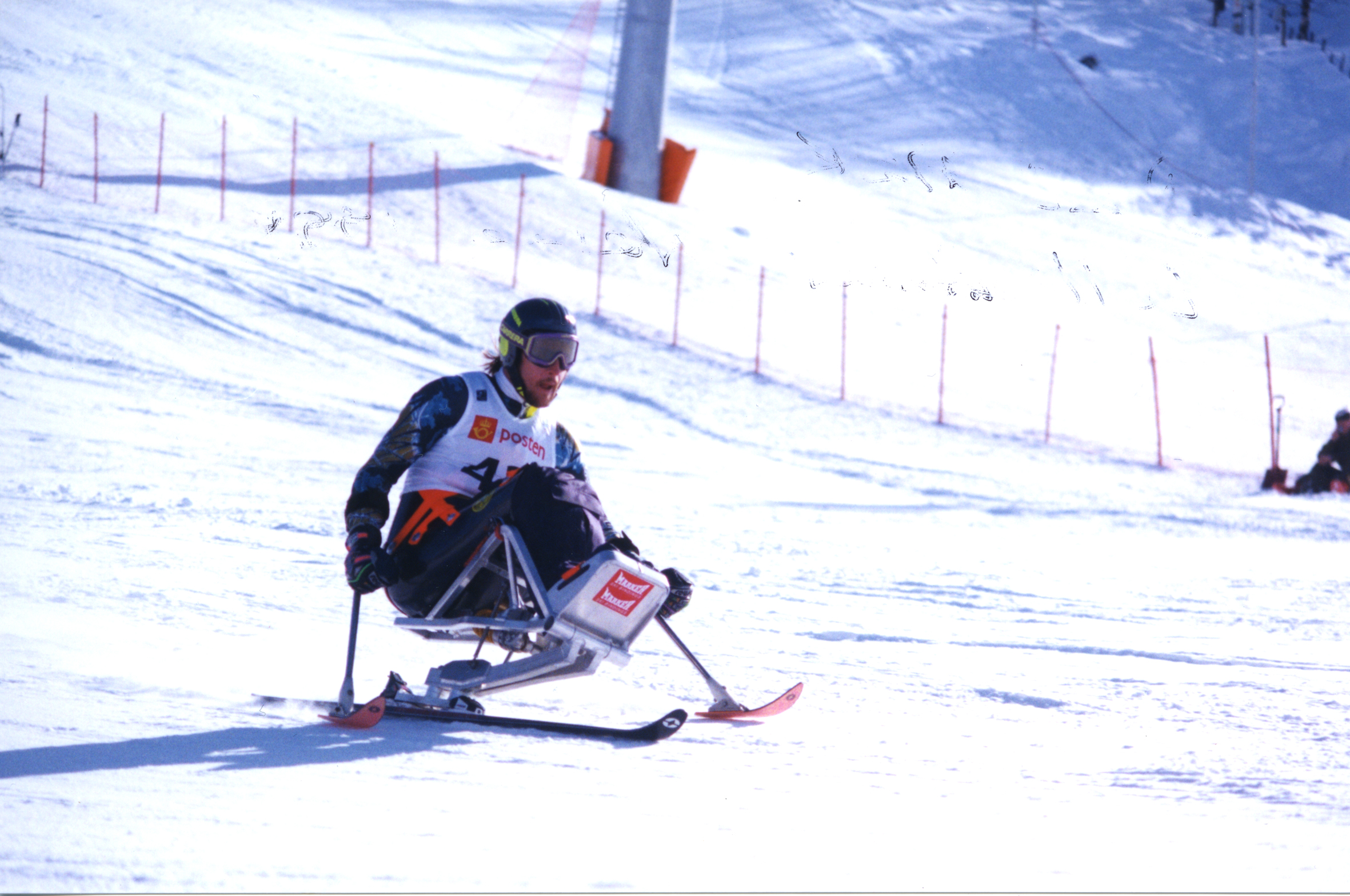
Australian skier David Munk goes down a hill at the Winter Paralympics with the aid of outriggers

Outrigger skis are skis that are used by para-skiers to assist with balance, turn, control their speed, stop and amplify the direction of turns. They vary in size and height, and include different features. Depending on the total number of skis used by the skier, outrigger configuration is sometimes called "Three Track Skiing" or "Four Track Skiing". When falling, skiers are taught to move their arms to prevent falling on the outrigger and injuring themselves.

== Equipment use ==
Outrigger skis were used on sleds during the 1960s as a way of keeping a traditional sled balanced by putting a third ski underneath the sled. Now, outrigger skis are skis that are used to help skiers balance, turn, control their speed and stop. They also help to amplify the direction of a turn initiated by shifts in the upper body.

In para-skiing, outrigger skis are an assistive device used by skiers with balance issues or amputations. They are used in both para-alpine skiing and para-Nordic skiing. The outrigger for para-skiing was first developed during the 1940s by Franz Wendel to enable him to ski following an accident that resulted in one of his legs being amputated. The origins of the outrigger for para-skiing connect to a crutch with a flip-ski attached to the end that was developed in Canada.

When a pair of outriggers are used for a skier with two skis, this is sometimes known as "Four track skiing". When a skier uses one ski and a pair of outriggers, this is called "Three track skiing."

== Equipment design ==
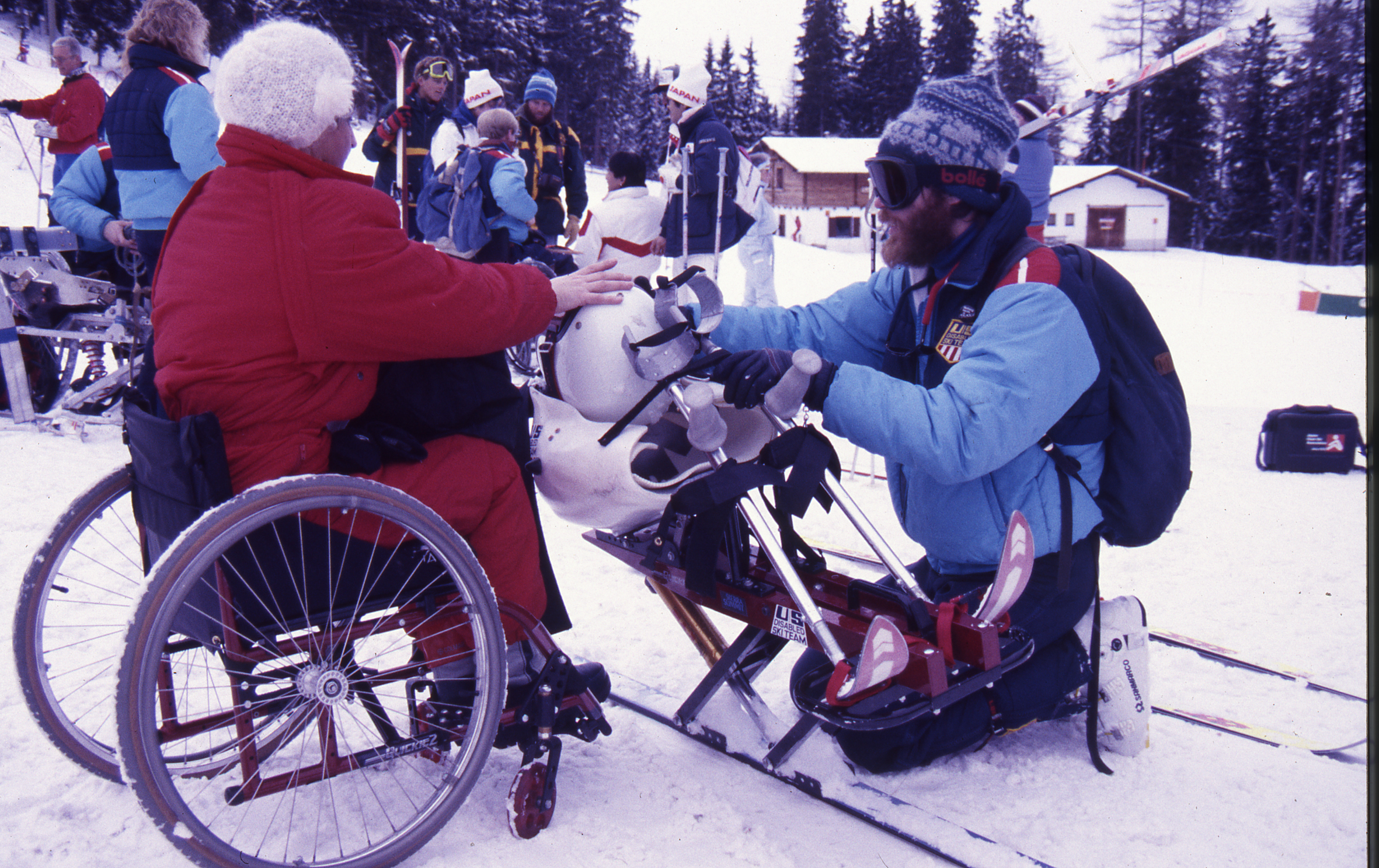

Outrigger skis come in a variety of sizes depending on the height of the skier and the type of skiing they will be doing. Outriggers can have different features depending on the needs of the skiers. One feature is a saw-tooth tail, which is often used by beginning skiers. Modern outrigger skis have two parts, a short ski attached to the bottom of a Lofstrand crutch. Outriggers can be adapted for use by skiers with arm amputations.

Some outriggers have a system built into them to allow pegs to be included so the outrigger can be used to aid in walking. Outriggers are sized for the back of the outrigger ski to line up with the heel of a skier's boot. There is an outrigger designed for going up hills. Downhill outriggers are unweighted. When falling, a skier should move their arms to bring the outrigger away from their body lest the outrigger cause them injury.

== Bibliography ==
- Armstrong, Neil; van Mechelen, Willem (2008). Paediatric Exercise Science and Medicine. Oxford University Press. ISBN 978-0-19-923248-2.
- Bainbridge, Donna Bernhardt (1985). Recreation for the Disabled Child. Psychology Press. ISBN 978-0-86656-263-8.
- Bradburn, Morris (2011). Growing Up North. iUniverse. ISBN 978-1-4620-1894-9.
- Hearst Magazines (1964). "Popular Mechanics". Popular Mechanics Magazine. Hearst Magazines. ISSN 0032-4558.
- Kasser, Susan L.; Lytle, Rebecca K. (2005). Inclusive Physical Activity: A Lifetime Of Opportunities. Human Kinetics. p. 212. ISBN 978-0-7360-3684-9.
- Kosut, Mary (2010). The Body Reader: Essential Social and Cultural Readings. NYU Press. ISBN 978-0-8147-9565-1.
- Winnick, Joseph P. (2010). Adapted Physical Education and Sport. Human Kinetics. ISBN 978-0-7360-8918-0.
- Vanlandewijck, Yves; Thompson, Walter (2011). The Paralympic Athlete: Handbook of Sports Medicine and Science. John Wiley & Sons. ISBN 978-1-4443-4828-6.
