= Monoski (disambiguation) =

A monoski is a single wide ski used for skiing.

Monoski may also refer to:

- Monoski (para-alpine) used in para-alpine skiing
- Monoski (waterskiing), or slalom water skiing
