= Skibobbing =

Winter sport

Skibob (also called skibob or snowbiking) is a winter sport involving a bicycle-type frame attached to skis instead of wheels and sometimes a set of foot skis. The use of foot skis is what defines "skibob".

Although skibobs are often called ski bikes or snow bikes, they are different, and the sport should also not be confused with snowbiking, which is the sport or recreation of bicycling on snow.

Type-1 skibob have minimal to no suspension. The rider sits on the seat and foot skis are used for control.

Type-2 bikes, also known as "peggers", are similar in design to a mountain bike which usually has full suspension but utilizes the foot pegs and are generally operated standing up. Also called "freestyle" ski bikes.

Type-3 bikes, or 'Trikes' have 1 ski in the front and 2 in the back and are considered more stable and easier to ride.

== History ==
Although the original idea for a bicycle with skis was patented as early as 1892, and skibobbing had been a form of transportation in the Alps, it was not until 1954 that the first international race was held. Seven years later, the FISB (Fédération Internationále de Skibob) was formed, which since 1967 has held an annual Skibobbing World Championship.

Originally, skibobbing was one of the very few methods by which people without strength in their knees could alpine ski, but it soon became a popular sport amongst the physically able, too. The main attractions are said to be the speeds attained (in some skibob giant slalom races, speeds of 120 miles per hour (190 km/h) or more can be reached) and the feeling of jet skiing on snow.

Austrian skibobber Erich Brenter is noted for setting the first world record for downhill skibobbing speed in 1964, at 102 miles per hour (164 km/h).

== Gallery ==
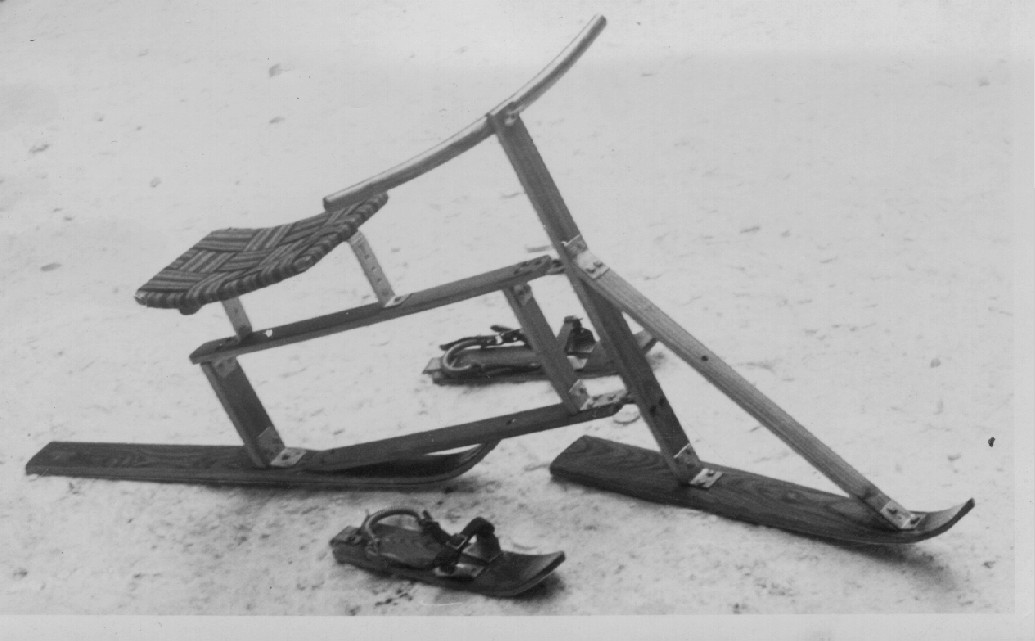
A 1949 skibob

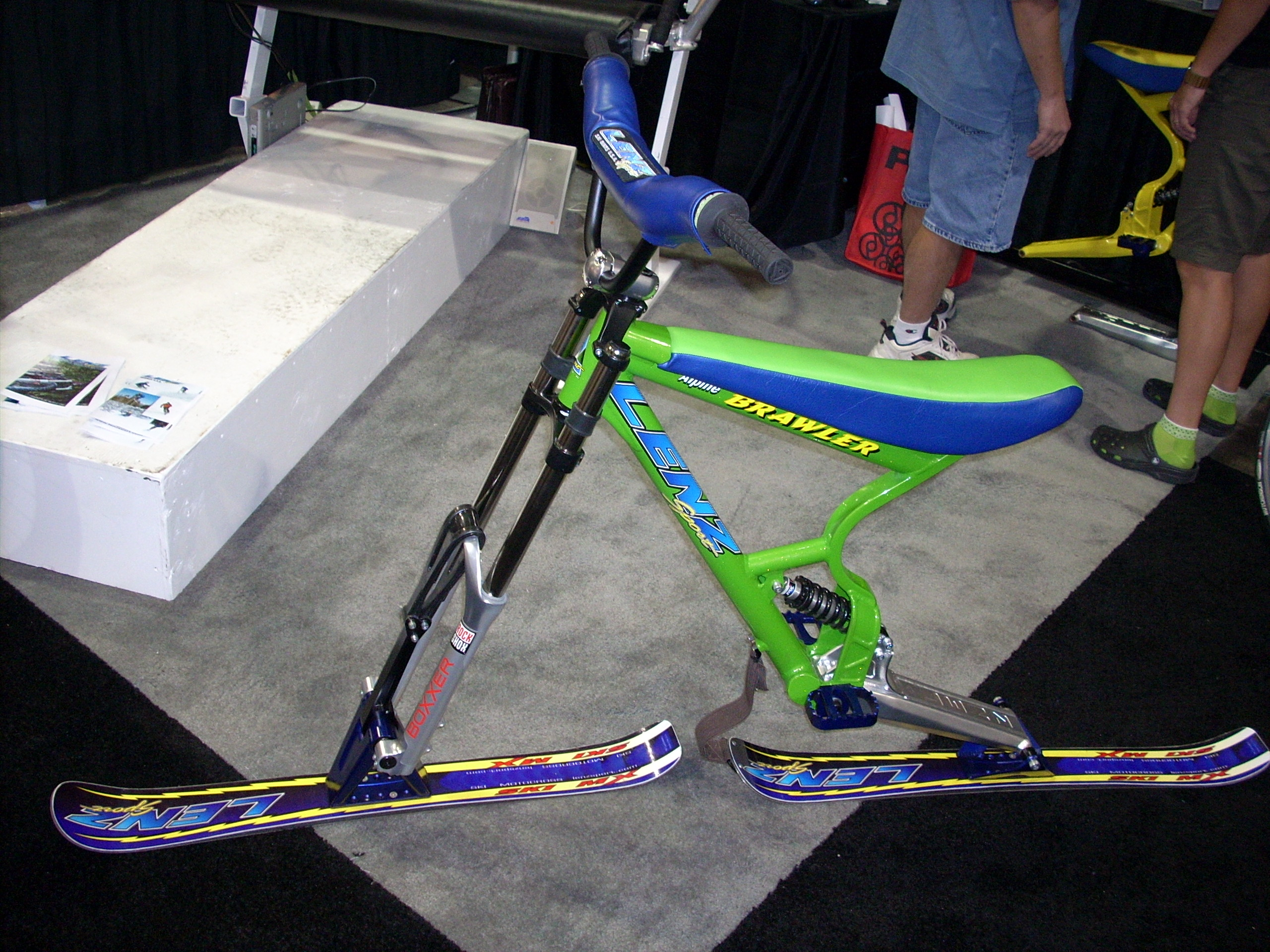
A Lenz Sport Ski Bike which is considered a Type-2 or "Pegger" ski bike

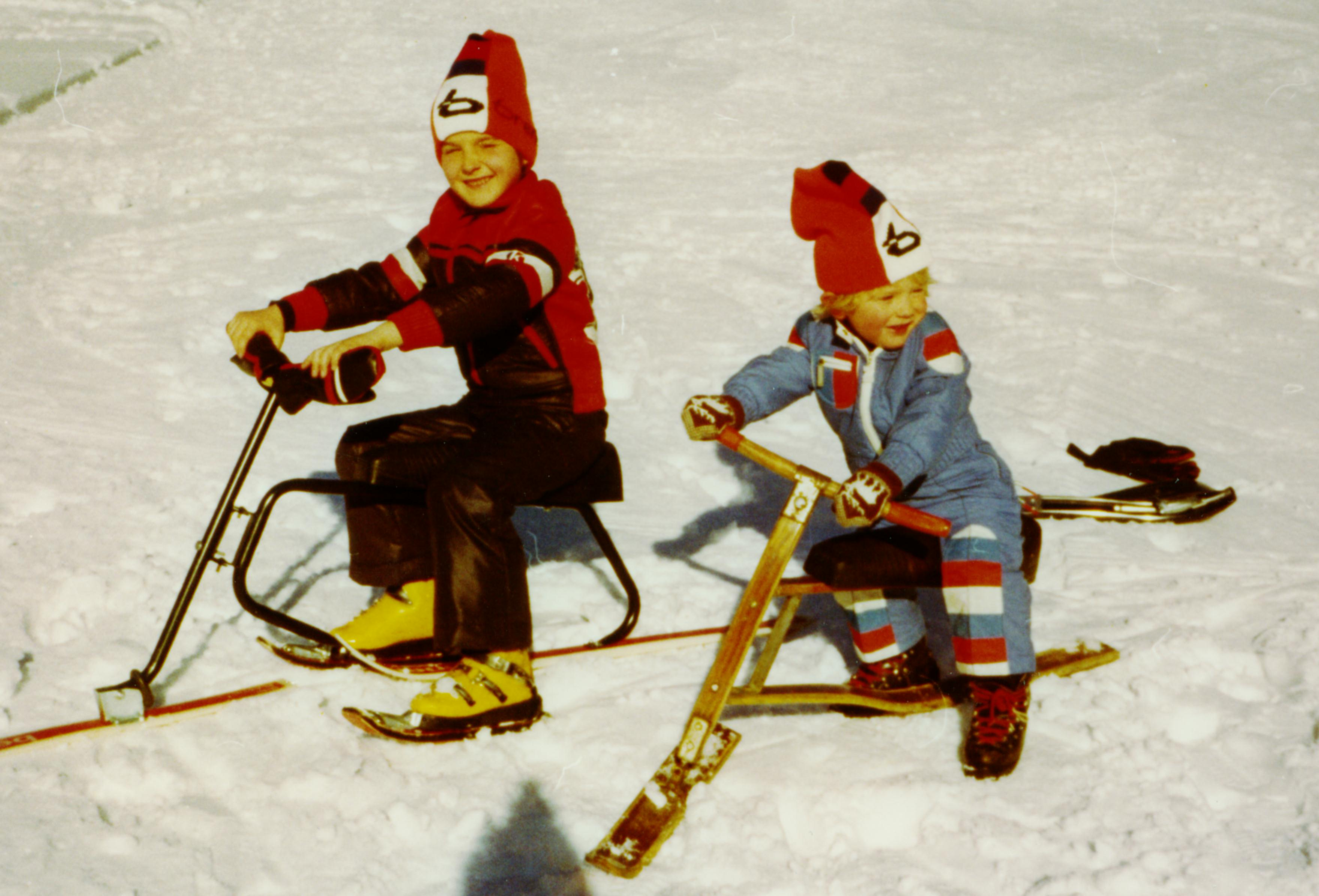
1976 skibobs

SMX Type-3 (Trike) ski bike

== See also ==
- Jack jumping
- Sit-ski, used in Para-alpine skiing
