= Squall (disambiguation) =

A squall is a sudden, sharp increase in wind speed.

Squall or The Squall may also refer to:

- The Squall, a 1929 film by Alexander Korda
- "Squall" (NCIS), an episode of the American television series NCIS
- "Squall", a 1980 studio album released by Japanese singer Seiko Matsuda
- "Squall" (song), a Japanese song by Masaharu Fukuyama also covered by Eiko Matsumoto
- "Squall" (song), a single released by Japanese band D'espairsRay
- Squall Leonhart, the main hero of the role-playing game Final Fantasy VIII
- USS Squall (PC-7), a Cyclone-class patrol ship
- "Back to Squall" a parody sketch of the film Back to School from the sketch show Tim and Eric Awesome Show: Great Job!
- Squall line, a type of thunderstorm
- Squall Meusel, a villain in the light novel, manga, and anime Infinite Stratos

== See also ==
- Skwal
- VA-111 Shkval, a Soviet/Russian supercavitating torpedo
