= Sledge hockey classification =

Disability sport classification system

Sledge hockey classification is the classification process for people who play ice sledge hockey. The classification system is governed by the International Paralympic Committee Ice Sledge Hockey.

== Definition ==
Functional mobility range of CP5 sledge hockey player

People with cerebral palsy in classifications from CP3 to CP5 are covered by sledge hockey classifications.

Unlike skiing, there is a sport specific approach to classification for hockey. It includes a medical examination.

For wheelchair hockey, there is only one class. Competitors go through a classification test to determine if they are eligible.

The Canadian Paralympic Committee says of sledge hockey, "To participate in IPC competitions and sanctioned events (i.e. Paralympic Winter Games), athletes must have an impairment of permanent nature in the lower part of the body of such a degree that it makes ordinary skating, and consequently ice hockey playing, impossible. Examples include amputation, spinal cord injury, joint immobility, cerebral palsy and leg shortening of at least 7cm and 'les autres.'"

== Governance ==
The sport is governed by the International Paralympic Committee Ice Sledge Hockey. While the CP-ISRA has an interest in the sport because it is open to people with cerebral palsy, it is not governed by them.

== Eligibility ==
Eligible ice hockey players need to have a permanent lower body physical impairment that prevents them from skating normally. People with chronic lower body pain are not eligible based on existing classifications.

== History ==
The sport was created in Sweden during the 1960s. The sport was one sports people with disabilities were more likely to play during the 1990s.

Prior to 1988, the classification assessment process generally involved a medical exam to determine the classification. The change in winter disability sport classification towards a more formal functional classification system happened more quickly as a result of changes being made in wheelchair basketball classification that started in 1983.

In 2002, for the Winter Paralympics, the Games Classifiers were Bjorn Hedman, Irv Grosfield, Carin Njorne and Michael Riding.

The Working Group was established by the IPC in early 2005 to improve on winter sport classification to insure it is as applicable as possible across all winter sports and all levels of competition. The Working Group was to report back to the IPC following the 2006 Winter Paralympics.

== Process ==
For Australian competitors in this sport, the sport is not supported by the Australian Paralympic Committee. There are three types of classification available for Australian competitors: Provisional, national and international. The first is for club level competitions, the second for state and national competitions, and the third for international competitions.

== At the Paralympic Games ==
At the 1976 Winter Paralympics, only amputee competitors were at the Paralympics when the sport was included as demonstration sport.

At the 1992 Winter Paralympics, wheelchair disability types were eligible to participate, with classification being run through the International Paralympic Committee. The sport made its full Paralympic debut at the 1994 Winter Paralympics.

At the 1994 Winter Paralympics, it was included as a full Paralympic sport for the first time.

== Future ==
Going forward, disability sport's major classification body, the International Paralympic Committee, is working on improving classification to be more of an evidence-based system as opposed to a performance-based system so as not to punish elite athletes whose performance makes them appear in a higher class alongside competitors who train less.
