= Winter sports =

Sports or recreational activities which are played on snow or ice

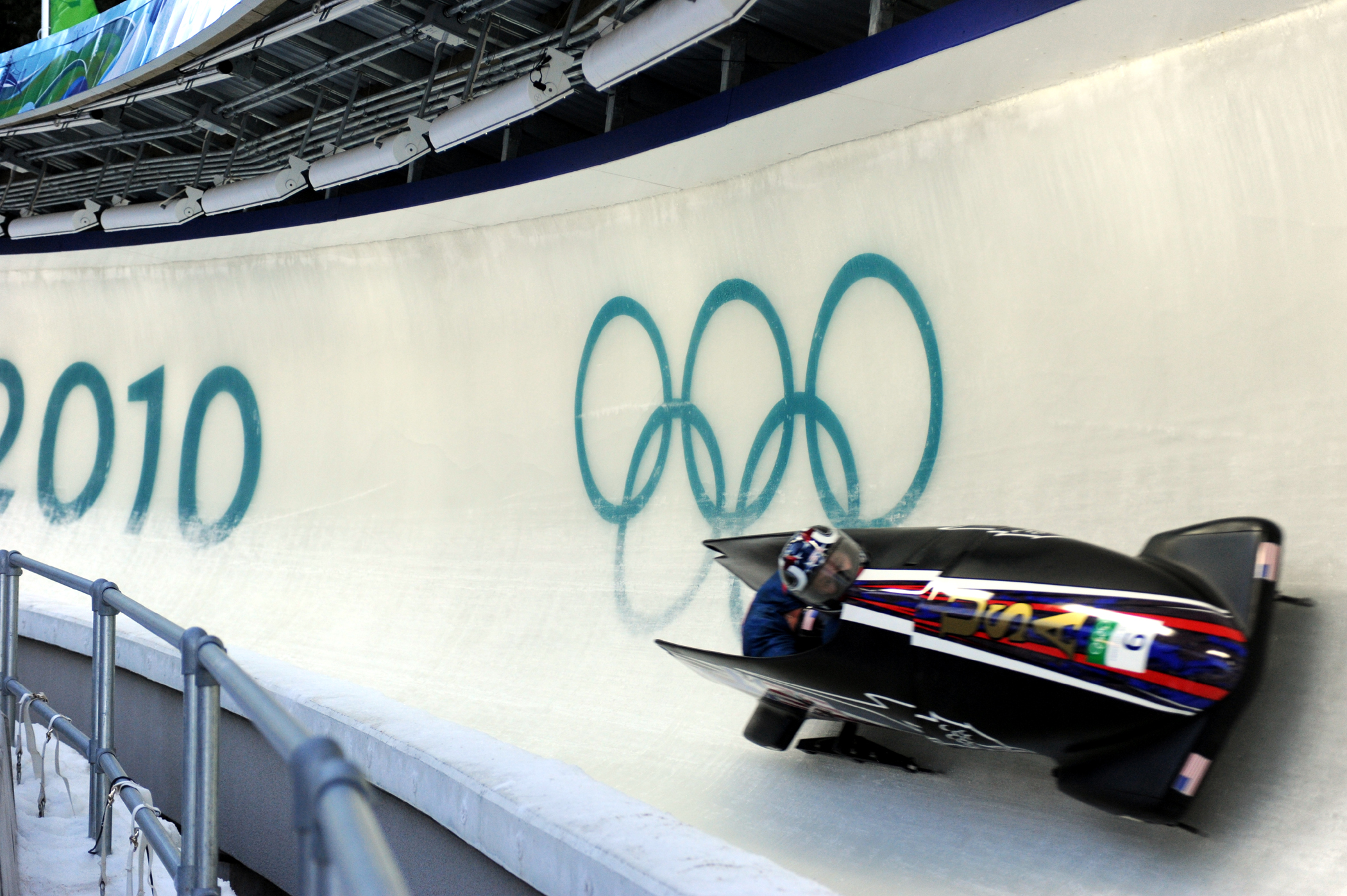
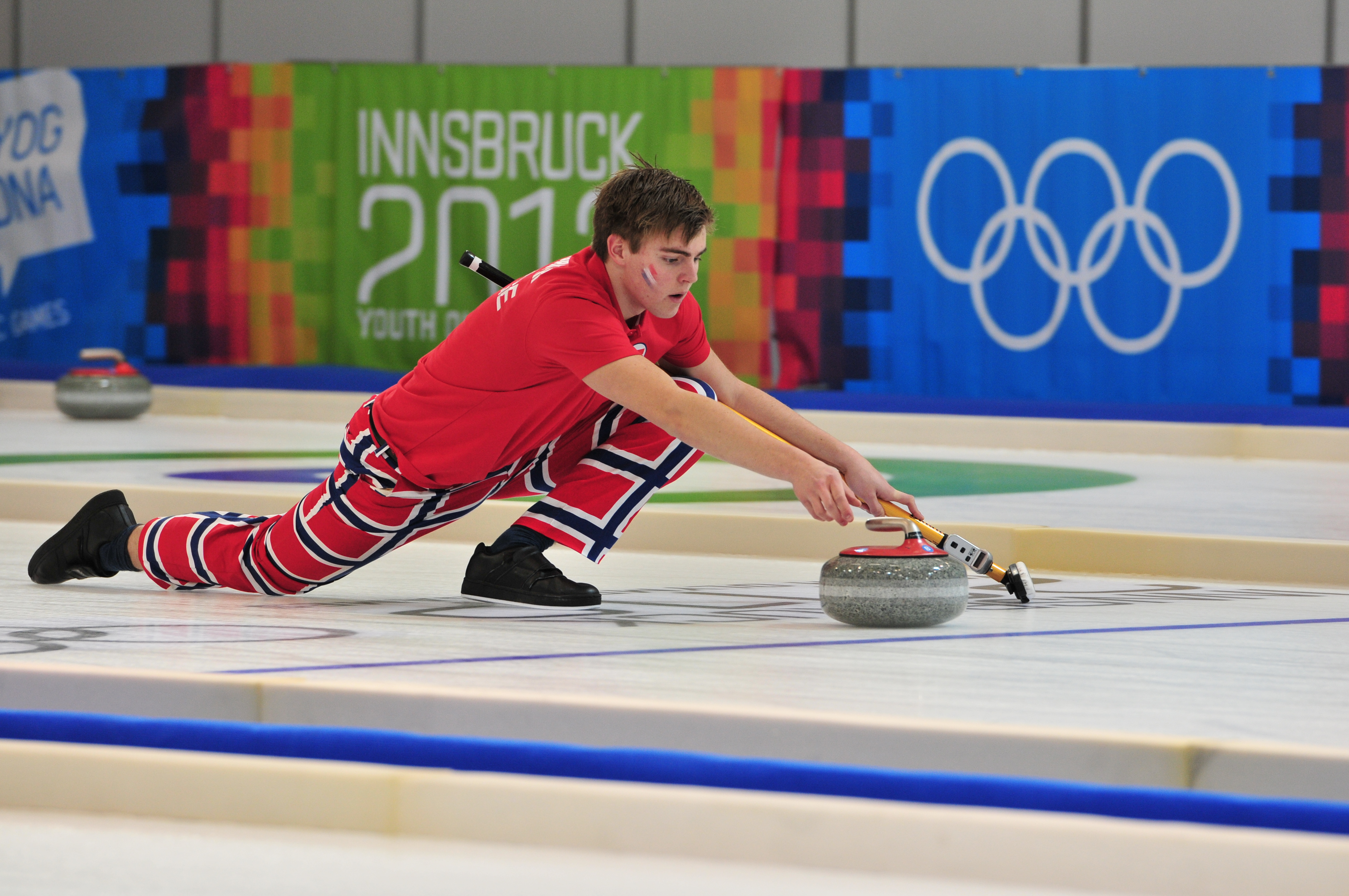
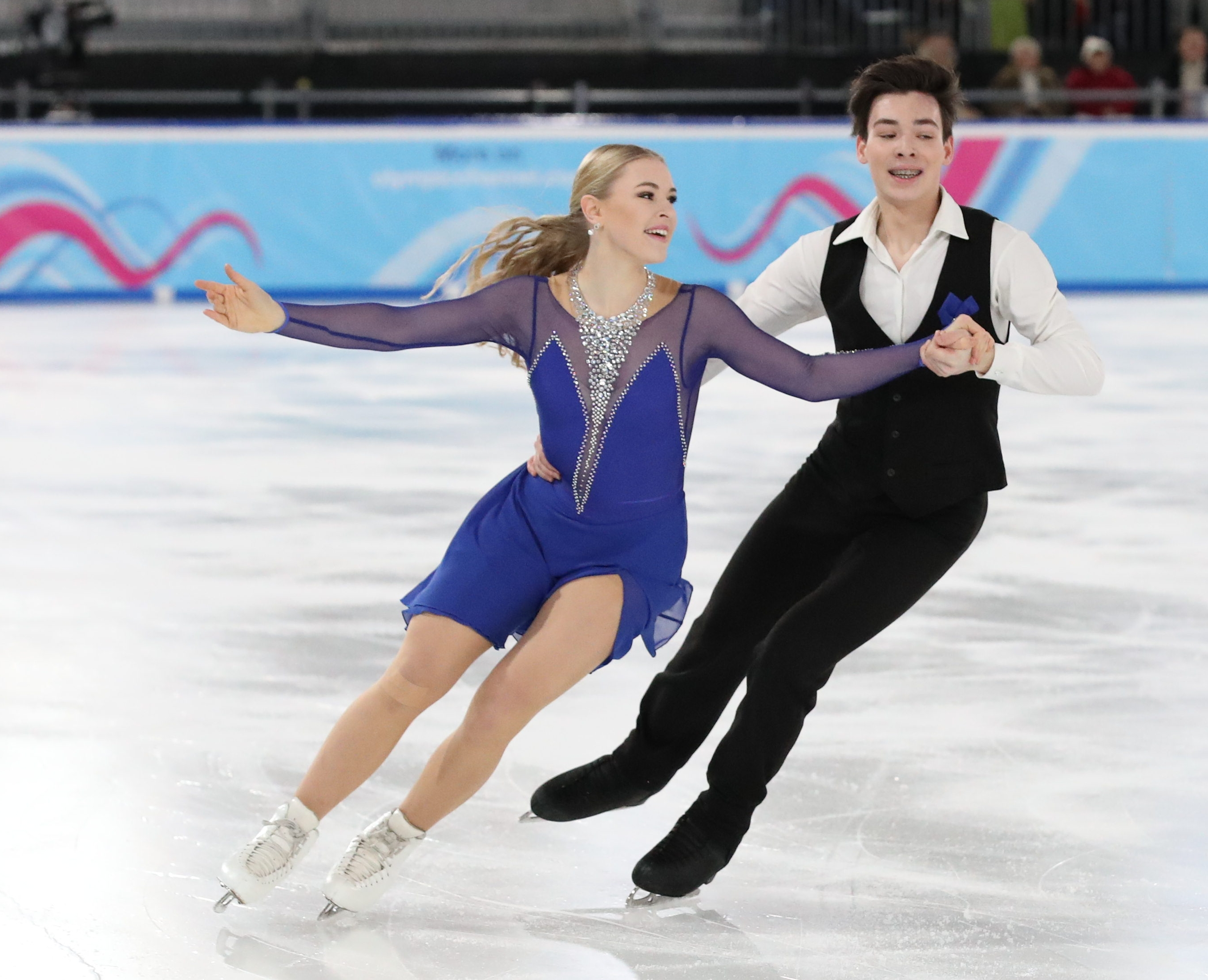
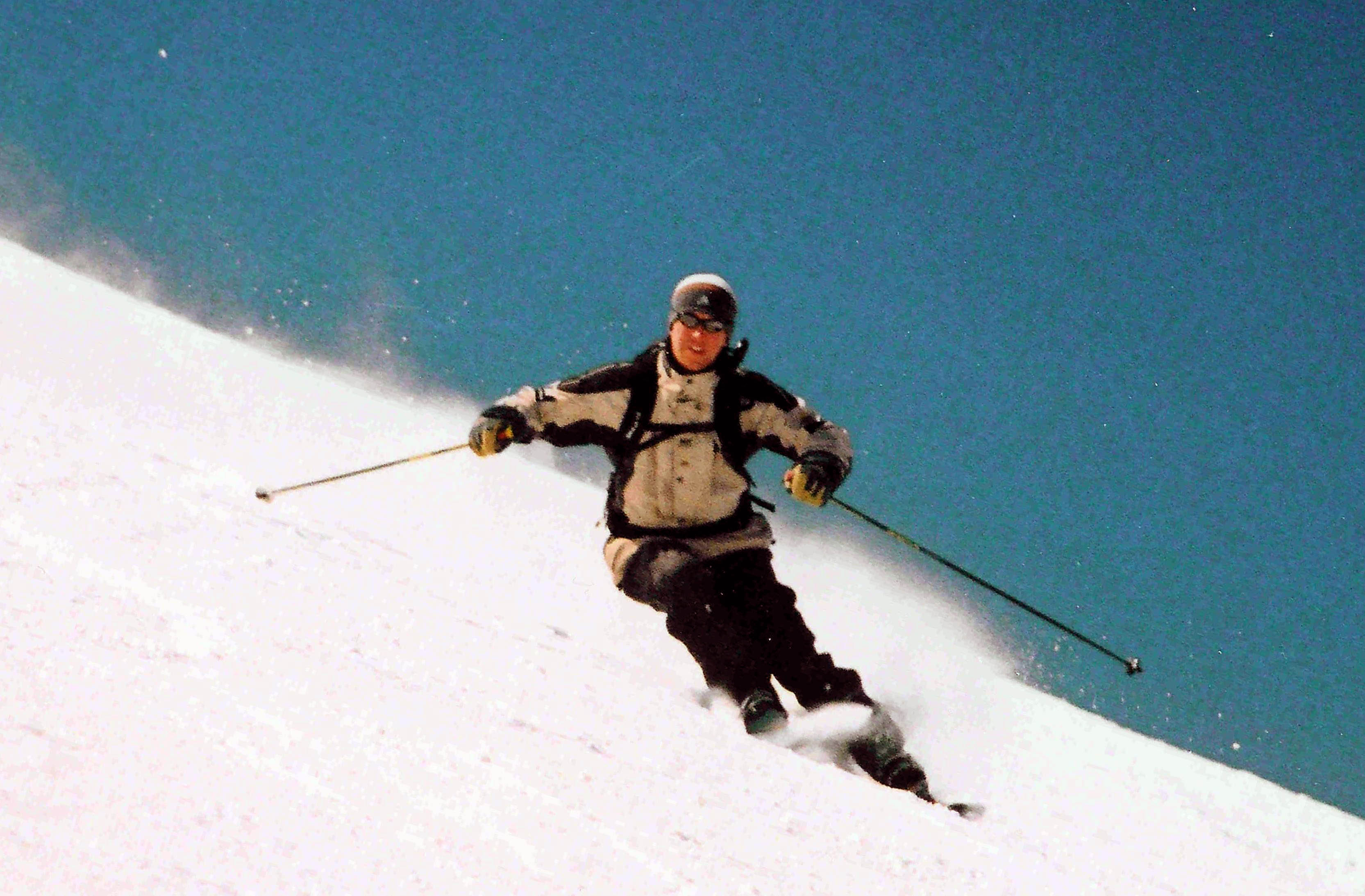
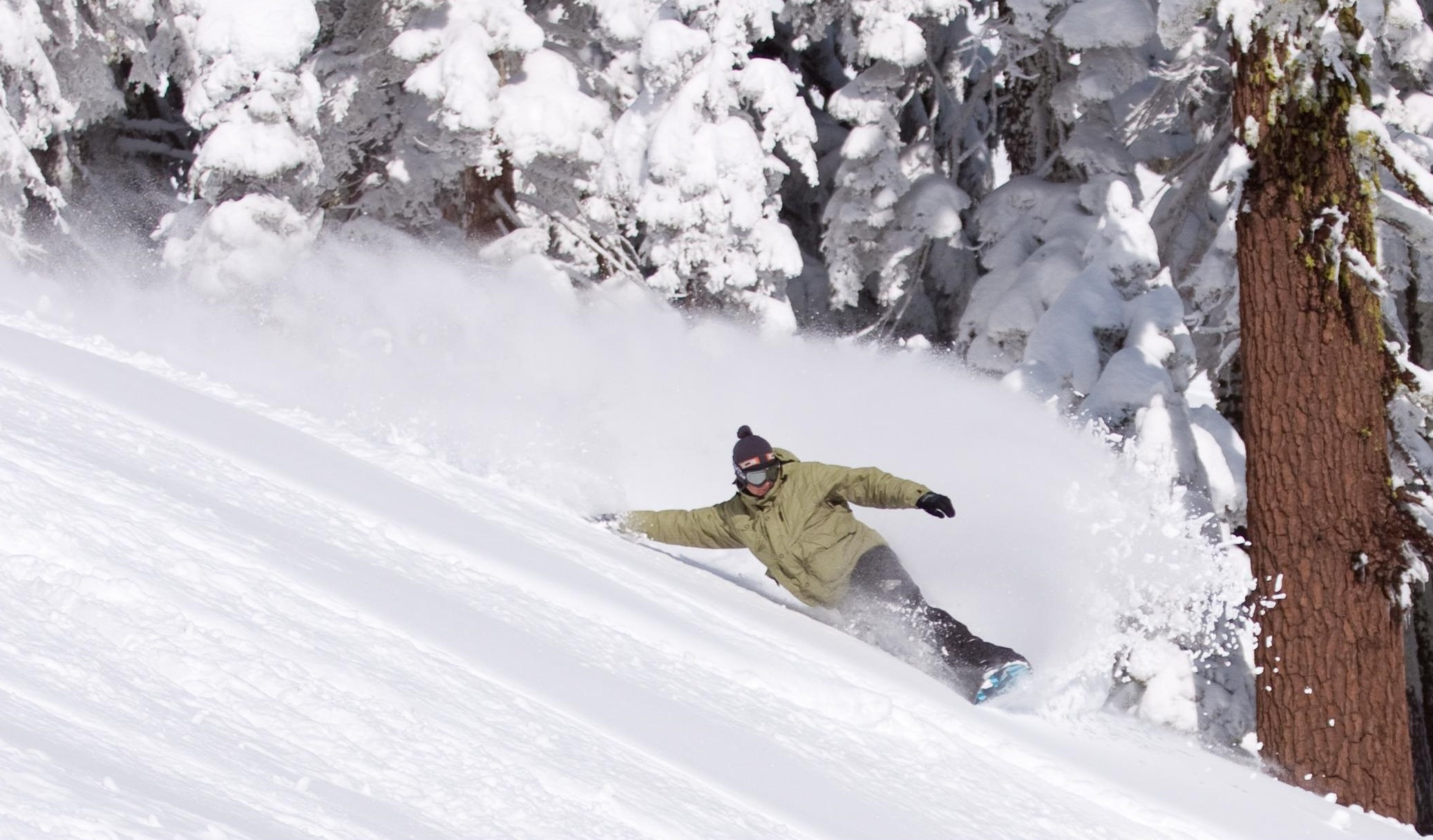
Several winter sports. Left to right, top to bottom: bobsleigh, curling, figure skating, ice hockey, skiing, and snowboarding

Winter sports or winter activities are competitive sports or non-competitive recreational activities which are played on snow or ice. Most are variations of skiing, ice skating and sledding. Traditionally, such games were only played in cold areas during winter, but artificial snow and artificial ice allow more flexibility. Playing areas and fields consist of either snow or ice.

Artificial ice can also be used to provide ice rinks for ice skating, ice hockey, para ice hockey, ringette, broomball, bandy, rink bandy, rinkball, and spongee in a milder climate. The sport of speed skating uses a frozen circular track of ice, but in some facilities the track is combined in an enclosed area used for sports requiring an ice rink or the rink itself is used. Alternatively, ice cross downhill uses a track with various levels of elevation and a combination of bends. Long distance skating (a.k.a. "marathon skating") such as tour skating is only performed outdoors and uses the available natural ice from frozen lakes, ponds, and marshes. Tour skating at times includes speed skaters, though tour skates are more common.

Common individual sports include: cross-country skiing, alpine skiing, snowboarding, ski jumping, speed skating, figure skating, luge, skeleton, bobsleigh, ski orienteering and snowmobiling.

Common team sports include ice hockey, ringette, broomball (on either an indoor ice rink, or an outdoor ice rink or field of snow), curling, rinkball, and bandy. Based on the number of participants, ice hockey is the world's most popular winter team sport, followed by bandy.

Winter sports at times have their own multi-sport events, such as the Winter Olympic Games and the Winter Universiade.

== History ==
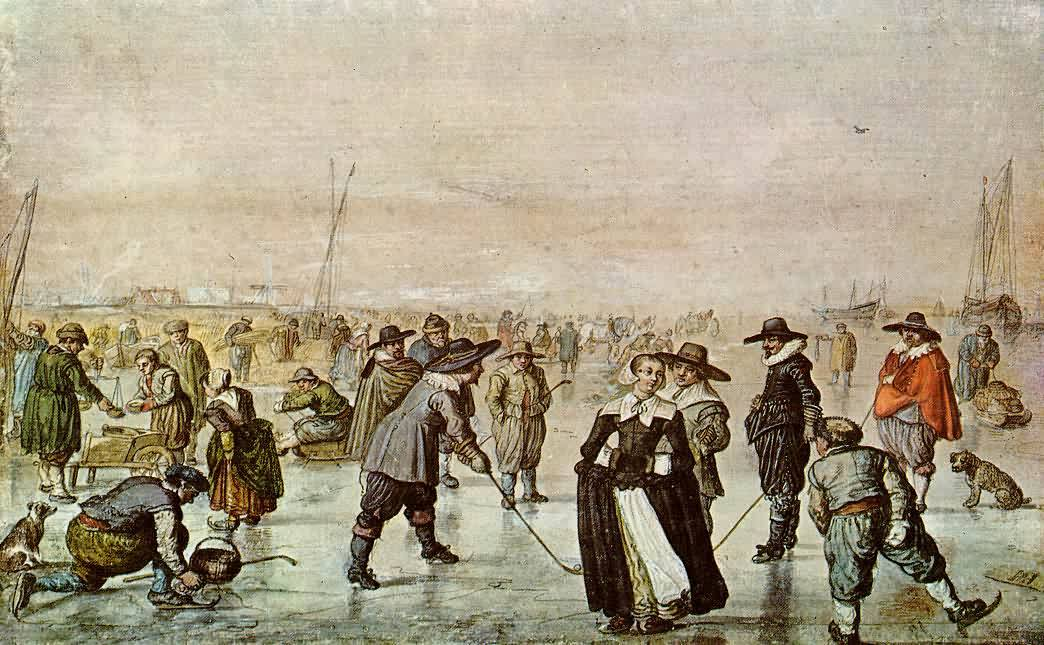
Skating in the 17th century

Snow and ice during the winter time has enabled sliding as a means of transportation, using sledges, skis and skates. This also led to different pastimes and sports being developed in the winter season as compared to other times of the year. Naturally, winter sports are more popular in countries with longer winter seasons.

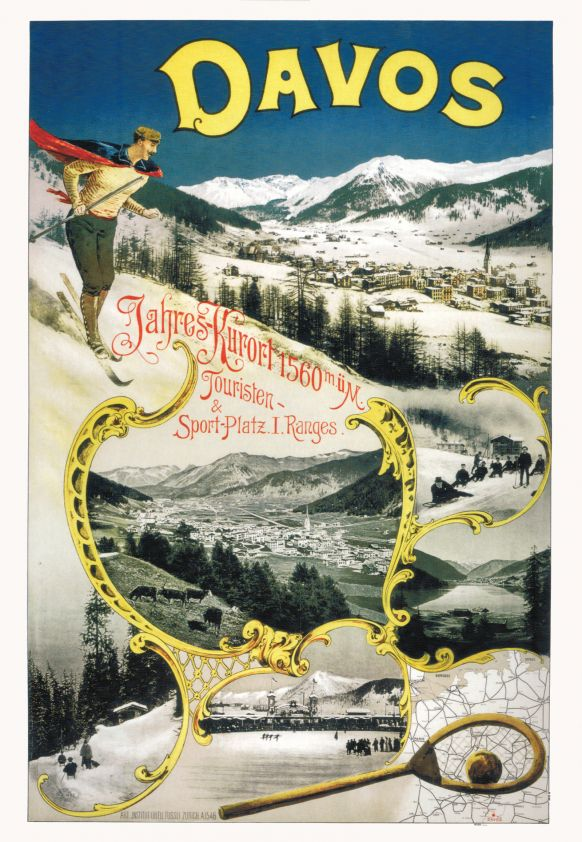
1901 Davos travel poster

In the European Alps, St. Moritz became a popular winter resort in 1864.

In the early days of the Olympics there was not much differentiation between the summer and winter games. These confusions would span from around the late 1890s until the early to mid 1900s. During this time, some sports considered to be winter sports and played or performed during the Olympic Winter Games today, would be held during the Olympic Summer Games. It was originally wanted to keep all of the Olympic sports together under one event and program, but due to environmental demands of some sports, it had to be separated.

While most winter sports are played outside, ice hockey, speed skating and to some extent bandy have moved indoors starting in the mid-20th century. Indoor ice rinks with artificial ice allow ice skating and hockey to be played in hot climates.

Outdoor winter sports will likely be severely impacted because of climate change in the next century.

== List of winter sports ==
Note: the Olympic rings next to a sport indicates that this particular sport is included in the Winter Olympic Games, as of the 2026 Winter Olympics in Milan and Cortina d'Ampezzo. The Paralympic logo indicates the same for a sport not in the Olympics but in the Winter Paralympic Games.

=== Ice skating ===
- Figure skating
- Short-track speed skating
- Speed skating
- Ice sledge speed racing

=== Skiing ===
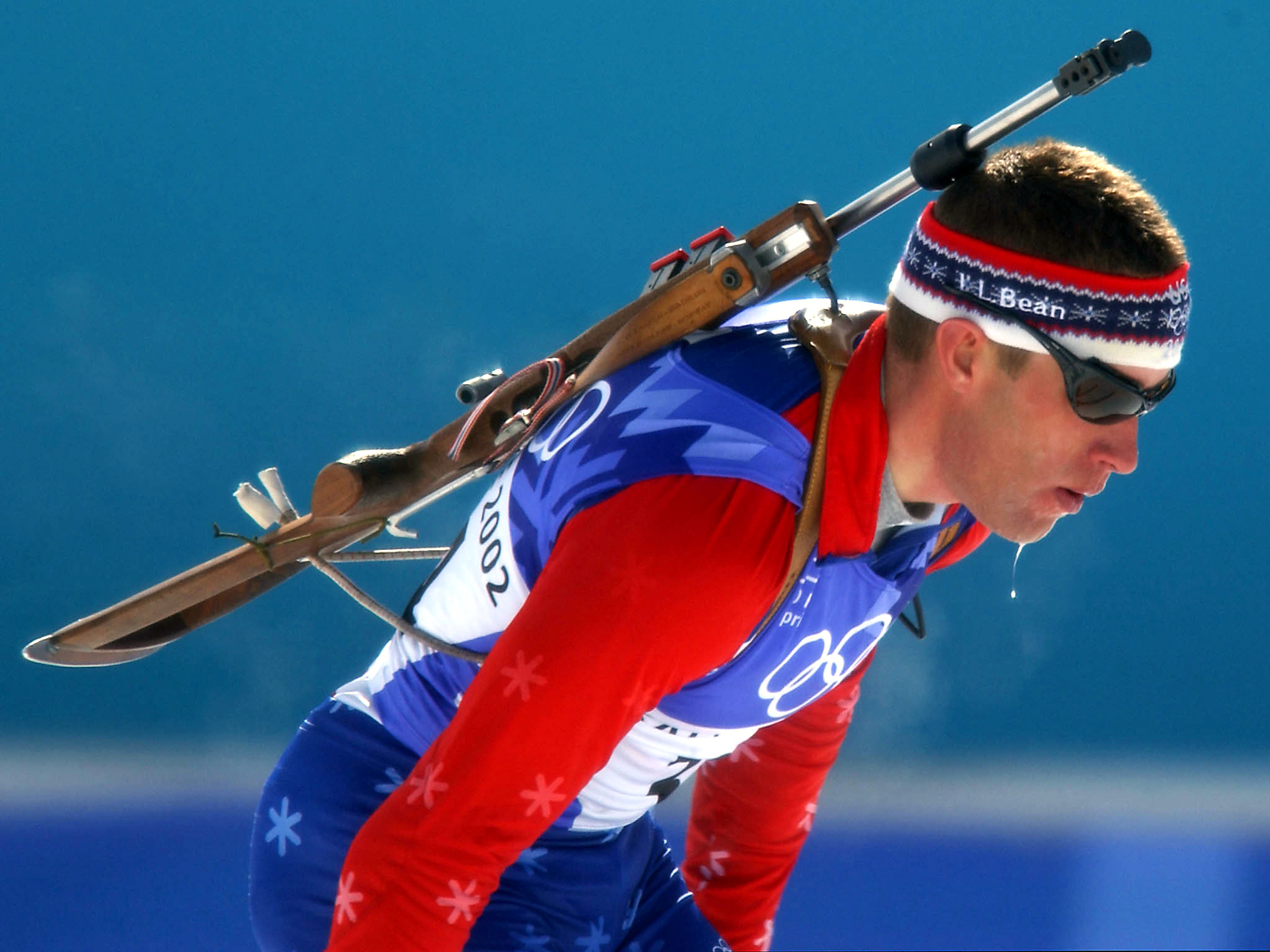
United States biathlete Jeremy Teela at the 2002 Winter Olympics.

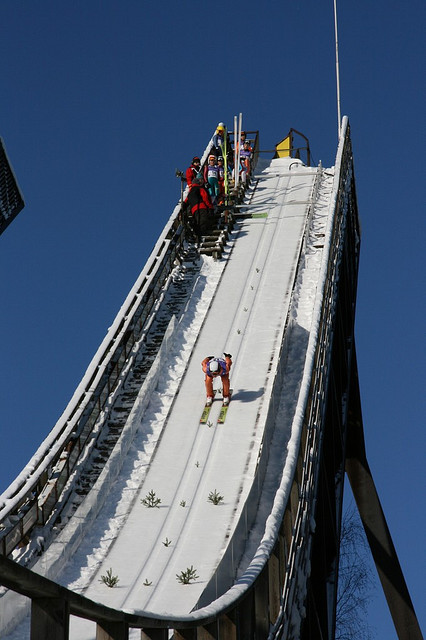
Ski jumping at Salpausselkä in Lahti, Finland in 2010

- Acroski (no longer part of the Winter Olympics)
- Alpine skiing
- Para alpine skiing
- Biathlon
- Para biathlon
- Cross-country skiing
- Para Cross-country skiing
- Downhill skiing
- Freestyle skiing
- Freeriding
- Jack Jumping
- Mogul skiing
- Monoskiing
- Newschool skiing
- Nordic combined
- Ski archery
- Skiboarding
- Skibob
- Skijoring
- Ski jumping
- Ski mountaineering
- Ski orienteering
- Snowkiting
- Speed skiing
- Speed riding
- Telemark skiing
- Winter pentathlon
- Ski-BASE Jumping

=== Sledding ===
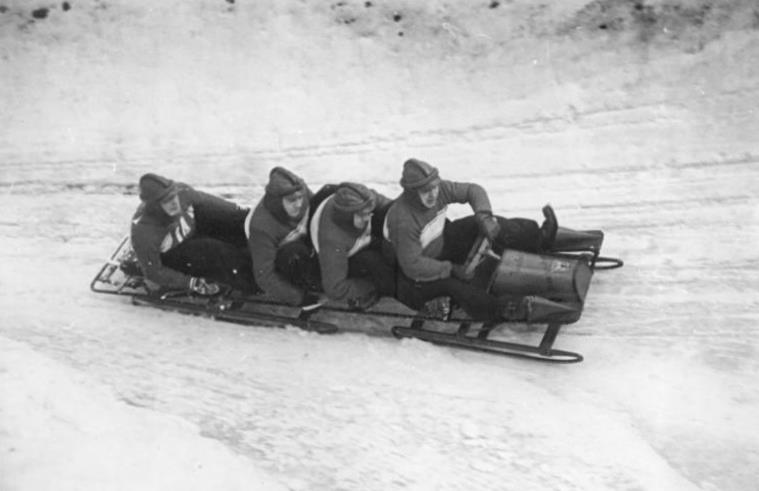
An East German bobsleigh in 1951, Oberhof track, Germany

Sports that use sleds going down ice tracks or pulled by something:

- Bobsled
- Dogsled racing
- Ice blocking
- Luge
- Skeleton
- Wok racing

=== Snowboarding ===
- Alpine snowboarding
- Boardercross
- Freeriding
- Para snowboard
- Slalom
- Snowskating
- Slopestyle

=== Snowmobiling ===
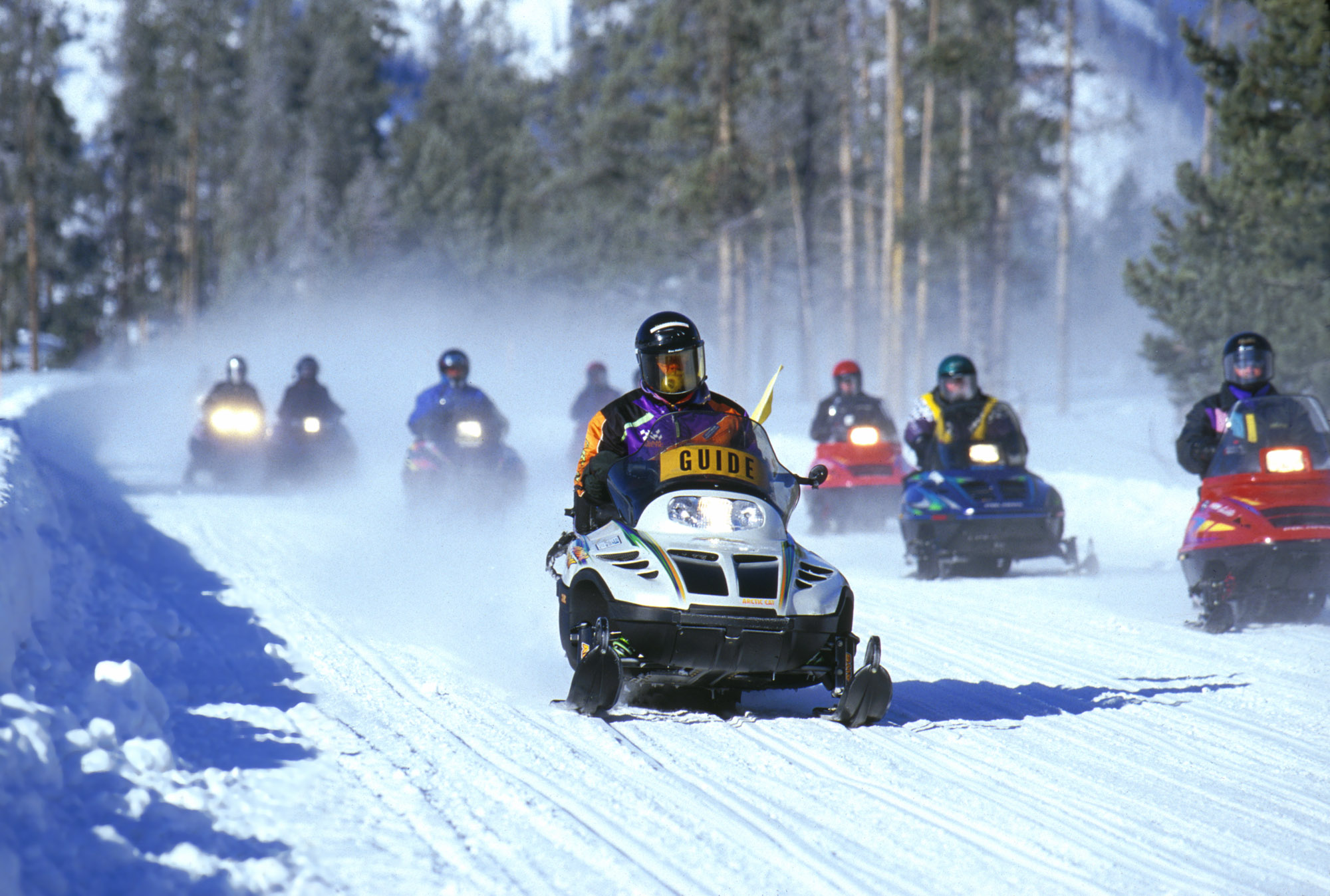
A snowmobile tour at Yellowstone National Park.

- Free style
- Snocross
- Recreation
- Cross-country
- Hill climbing

=== Team sports ===
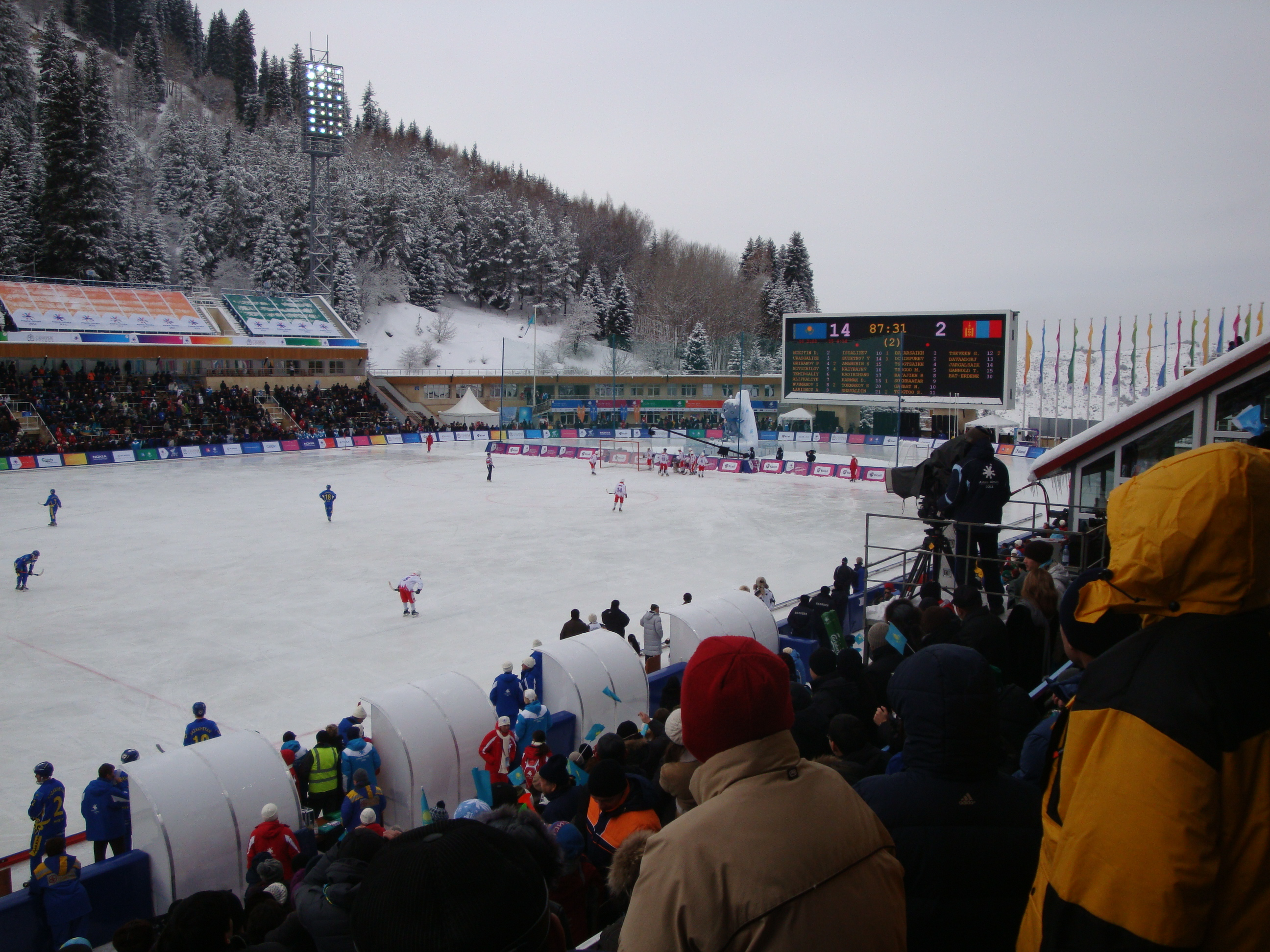
Based on the number of participating athletes, bandy is the second most popular winter sport in the world for men

- Bandy
- Broomball
- Curling
- Ice hockey
- Para ice hockey
- Wheelchair curling
- Ice stock sport
- Military patrol
- Moscow broomball
- Para ice hockey
- Ringette
- Rinkball
- Rink bandy
- Snow baseball
- Snow rugby
- Snow snake
- Snow volleyball
- Spongee a.k.a. Sponge hockey
- Synchronized skating
- Yukigassen (competitive snowball fight)

=== Other sports ===
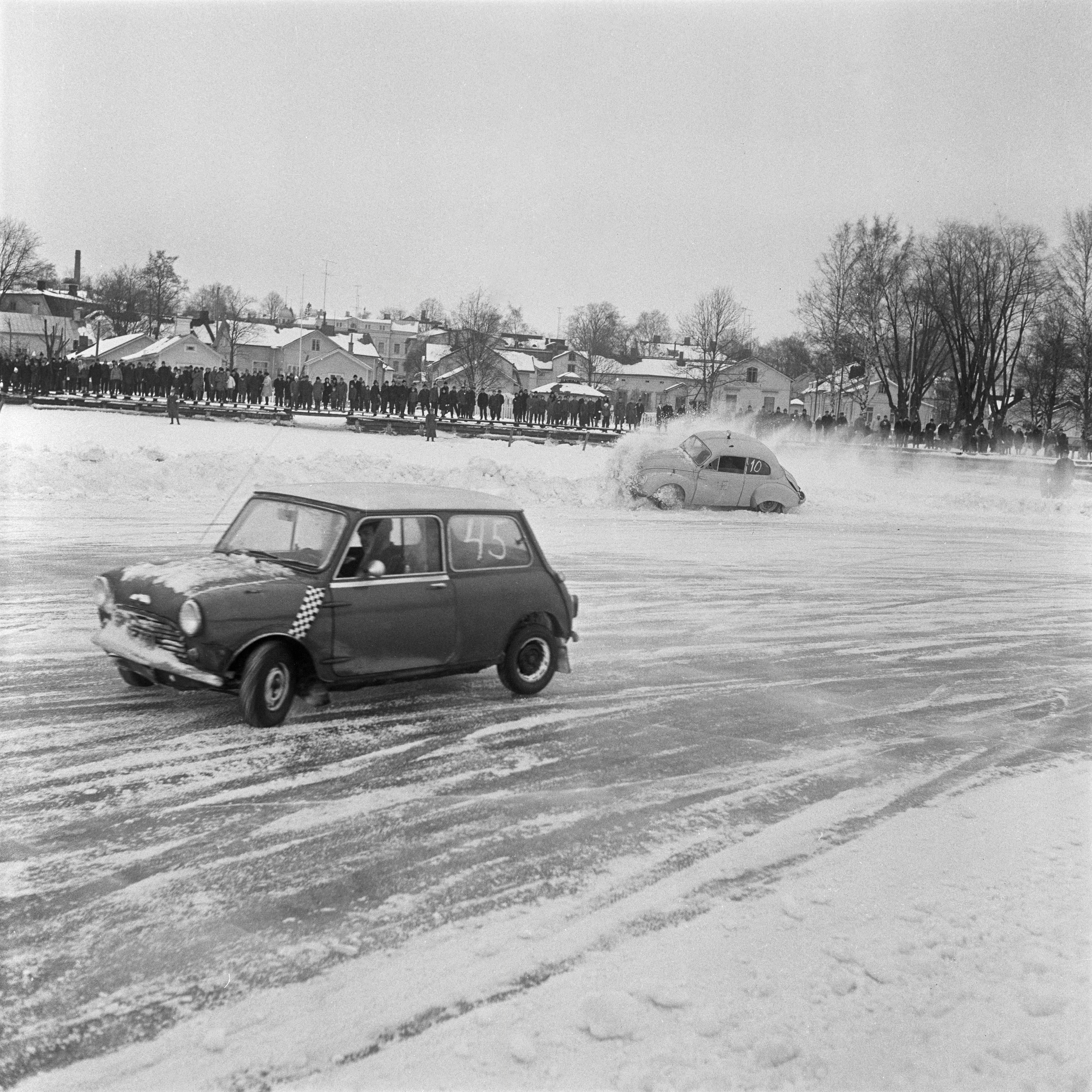
Ice track racing in Tammisaari 1964

- Cold-weather biking
- Barrel jumping - (discipline of speed skating)
- Ice canoeing
- Ice climbing
- Ice cricket
- Ice cross downhill
- Ice racing
- Ice speedway
- Snowshoeing
- Tour skating
- Snow drifting
- Snow golf (not to be confused with Crackgar, indigenous Kalash snow golf)
- Snow Bike (Cycling)
- Snow Cross (Moto Cycling)
- Snowboard Cross
- Snocross
- Snow Polo
- Snowshoeing

=== Recreational sports ===
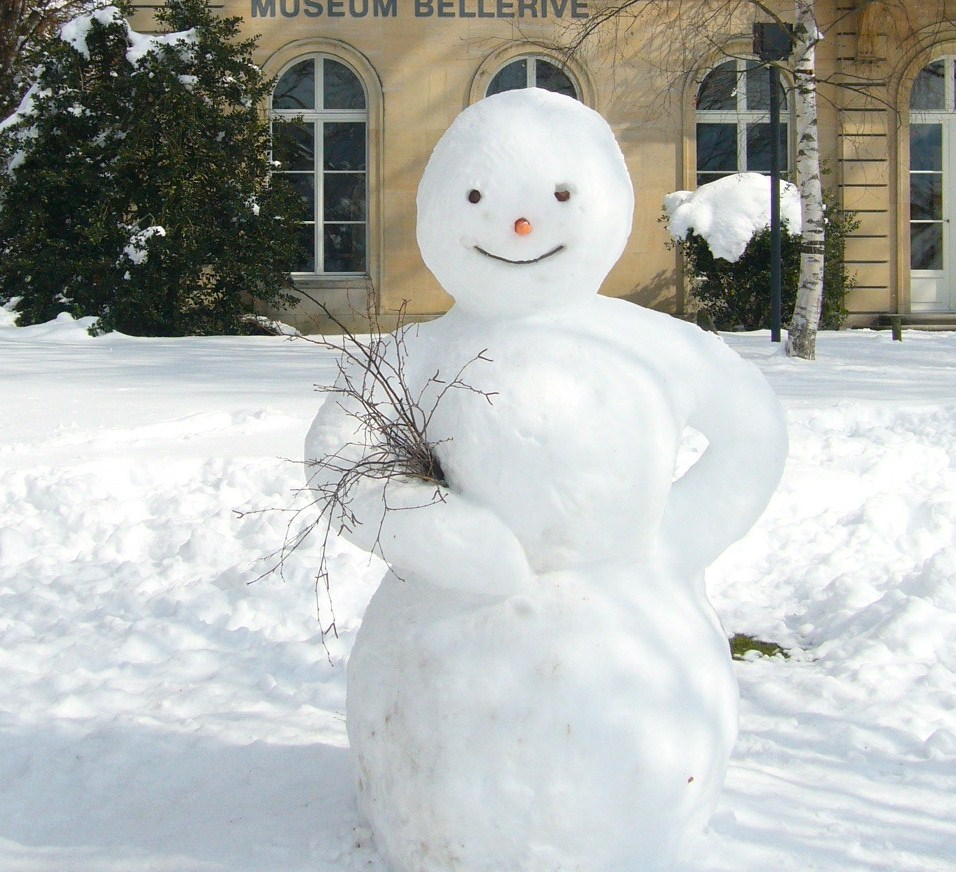
Snowman

Some sports are competed in (or simply enjoyed) on a more casual basis, often by children:

- Crackgar (indigenous Kalash snow golf)
- Ice boating or ice sailing
- Ice fishing
- SheenAab Jung (Jammu and Kashmir Snow Fighting)
- Tobogganing
- Snow bowling

== Notable winter sporting events ==
- Winter Olympic Games
- Nordic Games
- World Cup
- Arctic Winter Games
- Asian Winter Games
- Winter Paralympic Games
- Winter Universiade
- Winter Dew Tour
- Winter X Games
- Winter X Games Europe

== World Cup ==
- Bandy World Cup
- Biathlon World Cup
- Bobsleigh World Cup
- FIS Alpine Ski World Cup
- FIS Cross-Country World Cup
- FIS Freestyle Skiing World Cup
- FIS Nordic Combined World Cup
- FIS Ski Jumping World Cup
- FIS Snowboard World Cup
- Luge World Cup
- Short Track Speed Skating World Cup
- Skeleton World Cup (toboggan)
- Speed Skating World Cup
- World Cup in Ski Orienteering

== World championships ==
- Ice Hockey World Championships
- Curling World Championships
- Bandy World Championships
- Biathlon World Championships
- Bobsleigh World Championships
- FIS Alpine World Ski Championships
- FIS Freestyle World Ski Championships
- FIS Nordic World Ski Championships (cross-country skiing, ski jumping, and Nordic combined)
- FIS Snowboarding World Championships
- FIL World Luge Artificial Track Championships
- FIL World Luge Natural Track Championships
- FIS Ski Flying World Championships
- World Figure Skating Championships
- World Ringette Championships
- World Long Track Speed Skating Championships
- World Short Track Speed Skating Championships
- Skeleton World Championships (toboggan)
- World Ski Orienteering Championships
- FIM Snowcross World Championship
- UCI Snow Bike World Championships
- World Championship Snowmobile Derby

== See also ==
- Winter carnival
- Outline of sports
- Outdoor activity
