= Teleboard =

Type of snowboard

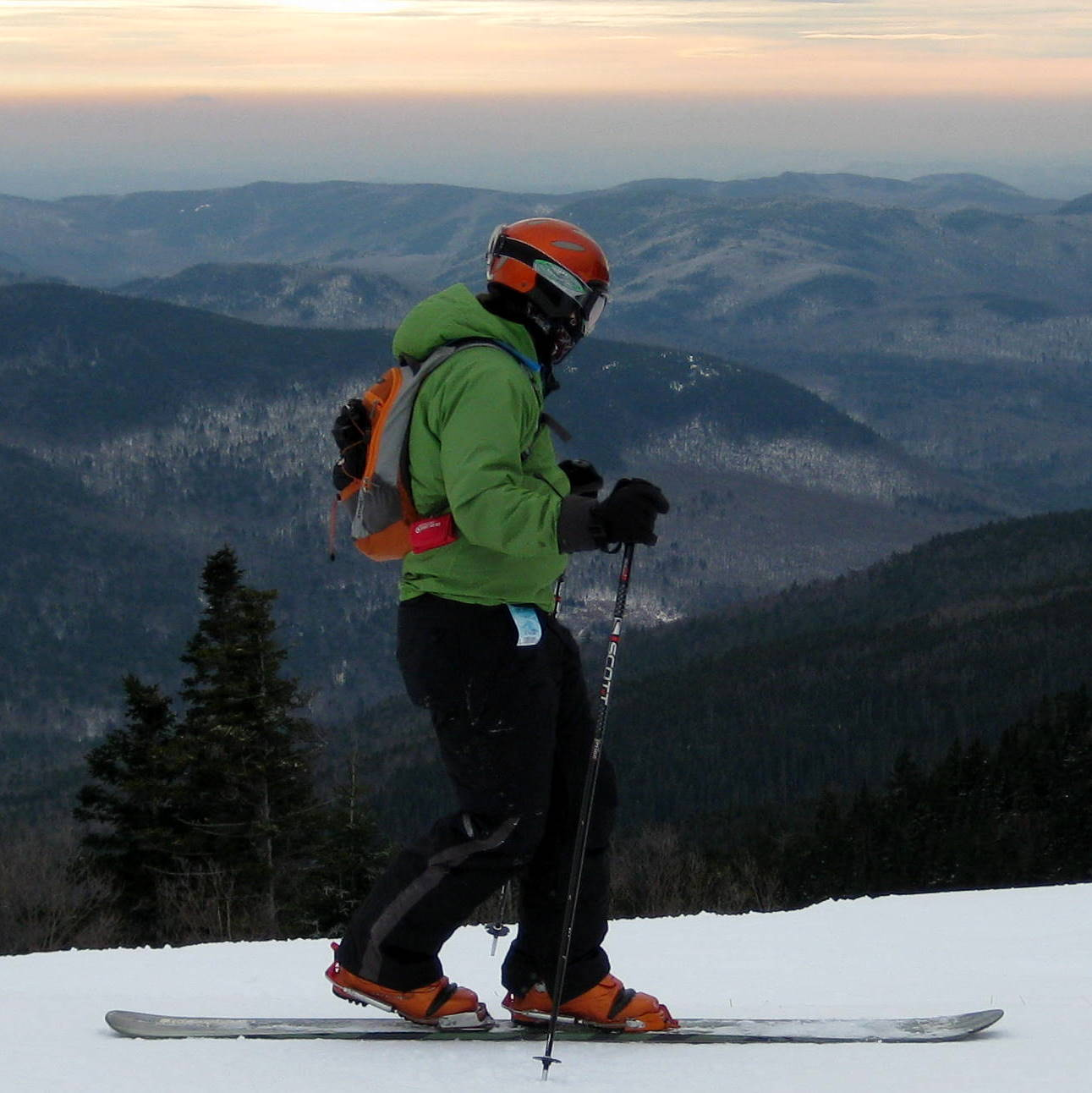
Teleboard, side view

A teleboarder riding a King Carve 191 at Wachusett Mountain

Developed during the winter of 1996 by Martin and Erik Fey, the Teleboard consists of a long, narrow snowboard, or wide ski, with two free-heel telemark bindings arranged one in front of the other at a slight angle to the longitudinal axis. This is similar to a skwal which uses fixed-heel bindings mounted in line with each other.

== History ==
When experimenting with successively narrower alpine snowboards to allow for quicker turns, the Fey brothers ended up with a board that could not fit hard-plate snowboard bindings, and tried telemark bindings instead. After a successful trial down a mogul run at Killington (one of the only remaining open trails in New England at the end of that ski season), they continued to refine the design. The Teleboard earned them two patents between 1997 and 1999. The Fey Bros went on to found Telemarkdown.com and continue to sell Teleboards as well as Telemark and AT ski gear in their two New England shops.

== Physical characteristics ==
The unique binding alignment coupled with the use of free-heel bindings on the teleboard allows the rider to face forward and have complete freedom over weight distribution. The rider can focus their weight down on the center of the board to flex it and carve tightly, or distribute weight over the length to keep the board straighter. Also, weight can be shifted vertically, by standing tall or kneeling. This extension and flexion is an essential part of carved turns, and the extent of them that the teleboard allows lends itself to deep or extreme carving. The extremely close angle of the bindings, along with the long length and narrow width of the board make the Teleboard extremely easy to use for quick edge changes, rendering the board ideal for riding bumps, carving tight turns, and reacting to unexpected obstacles. Also, the edge radius of Teleboards tends to be very small, comparable to slalom skis, which is unusual for skiing or riding devices as long as a teleboard. Because the bindings are mounted almost in-line with the direction of the board, it is possible for the rider to use poles, which can aid the rider in learning the sport.

== Patents ==
The patent for the Teleboard is held by Uniboard, Inc. (US Patent #6000711)

The abstract is as follows:

A skiboard system is provided, which includes a divisible skiboard having left and right skiboard halves and left and right loose heel binding. When the skiboard halves are joined, the skiboard has a central, waist portion and an upward curving front shovel area. The left and right loose heel bindings may be secured on the left and right skiboard halves when the skiboard halves are divided, oriented substantially parallel to the longitudinal axes or the skiboard halves. When the skiboard halves are joined, the left and right loose heel bindings are mounted on opposite sides of the skiboard waist at an acute angle less than 35 degrees from the longitudinal axis.

No implementation of this 'split' board described in the patent is commercially available. All commercial teleboards are made of a single monolithic piece, and therefore are most appropriate for resort skiing, not the backcountry approaches which would be possible with a splitboard.

== Specifications ==
Several models of teleboards have been manufactured for sale.

=== Pipe Dreamer 168 ===
The Pipe Dreamer 168 was designed for the pipe and park, and for younger, lighter riders. The deck is 168 cm long, with dimensions (Tip / Waist / Tail) of 187mm, 120mm, 183mm. The sidecut radius is 9.4m with an effective edge of 148 cm.

=== Legend 181 ===
The legend 181 is based on the design of the original Teleboard. It was the first Teleboard to make the descent of Mount Washington's Tuckerman Ravine. The deck is 181 cm long with dimensions (Tip / Waist / Tail) of 195mm, 122mm, and 179mm. The sidecut radius is 9.3m with an effective edge of 158 cm.

=== Pursuit 191 ===
The Pursuit 191 along with the King Carve 191 are the two longest Teleboards available. The Pursuit 191 was designed to be the longer brethren to the Legend 181 for those who want the additional stability which comes with a longer plank. The dimensions (Tip / Waist / Tail ) are 199 cm, 127 cm, and 185 cm. The sidecut radius is 9.3 m with an effective edge of 168 cm.

=== King Carve 191 ===
The King Carve 191 was a stiffer version of the Pursuit 191 mounted with 25mm solid polymer risers and Rottefella Cobra K hardwire bindings. The dimensions are identical to the Pursuit 191.

=== 2013 Mark F 186 ===
186cm. Added early rise; gives the board much better float in powder and makes the tip easier to manage in moguls

=== 2013 Sheriff 198 ===
Longer and more stable.

=== 2025 F-185 SummitCone ===
Designed for stability.

== See also ==
- Winter sport
- Skiing
- Alpine skiing
- Freestyle skiing
- Mogul Skiing
- Monoskiing
- Skiboarding
- Skwal
- Snowkiting

== External references ==
- Uniboards Corporate Website
- US Patent 6000711
- US Patent 5816590
- Free-Heel-Boarding: The Techniques and Unique Aspects of Free-Heel Boarding (Book)
- Extreme Carving - The Carver's Almanac
- Board Manufacturers: Teleboard - The Carver's Almanac
