= Sledge racing classification =

Disability sport classification system

Paralympic sledge racing classification is the classification system for sledge racing that is based on functional mobility related to how people sit in a sled.

== Definition ==
Classification is based on how a person sits in their sled. The classification system used is a functional mobility based one.

== Governance ==
While the CP-ISRA has an interest in the sport because it is open to people with cerebral palsy, it is not governed by them.

== History ==
Prior to 1988, the classification assessment process generally involved a medical exam to determine the classification. The change in winter disability sport classification towards a more formal functional classification system happened more quickly as a result of changes being made in wheelchair basketball classification that started in 1983. The sport was one sports people with disabilities were more likely to participate in during the 1990s.

== At the Paralympic Games ==
At the 1976 Winter Paralympics, only amputee competitors were included at the Games in full medal sports. This sport was a demonstration sport for spinal paralysis classes. At the 1980 Winter Paralympics, this was only one of two sports open to athletes with lower limb paralysis classifications. At the 1994 Winter Paralympics, wheelchair disability types were eligible to participate, with classification being run through the International Paralympic Committee, with two classification types. Due to the lack of countries registered in the 1994 and 1998 Winter Paralympic Games, the sport was removed from the Paralympic program in 1999.
