= Skwal =

Main piece of equipment used for skwalling

A skwal is the main piece of equipment used for skwalling, a hybrid sport combining the carving of skiing and riding feel of snowboarding. It is similar to a snowboard or monoski in that both feet are attached to the same board. On a skwal the feet are one in front of the other, in line with the direction the skwal is pointing in. This differs from snowboards (in which the feet are side-on to the direction of the board) and monoskis (in which the feet point in the direction of the board, but are side-by-side).

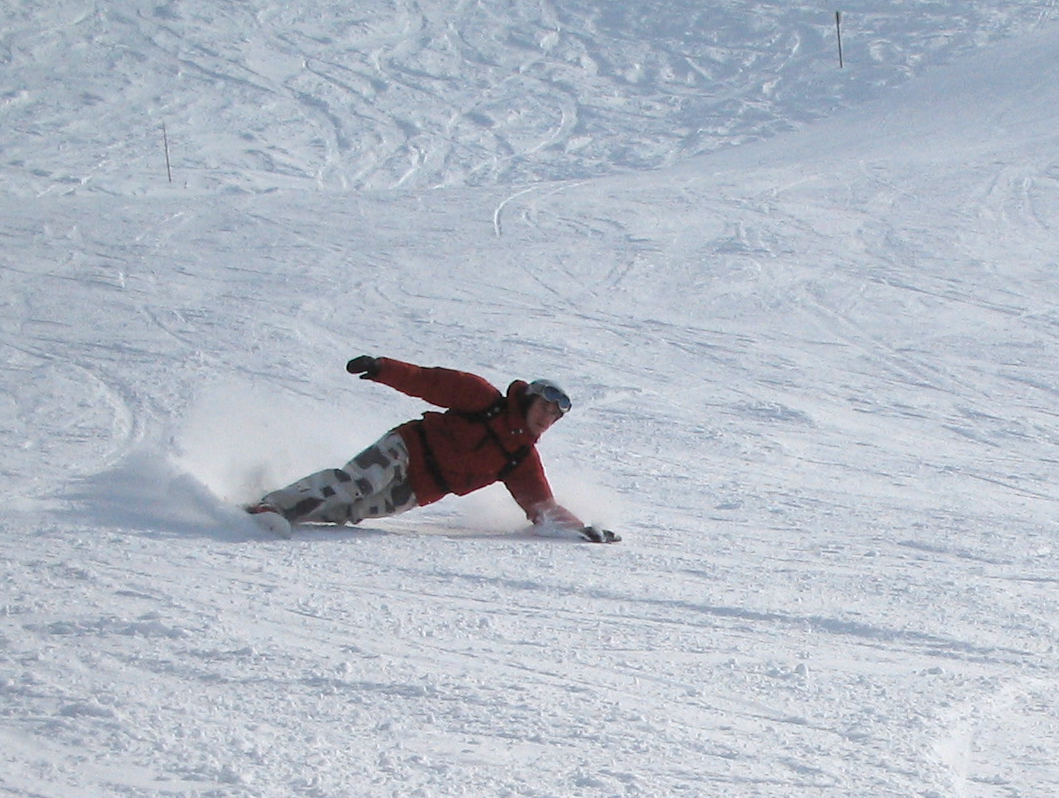
skwalling

== History ==
The skwal was invented by two French ski-school instructors Patrick "Thias" Balmain and Manuel Jammes, with the first prototypes (3) appearing in 1992, made by J.B. at Skis Lacroix for the November show in Les 2 Alpes. They envisaged it as a way to offer different sensations to what skiing and snowboarding could offer, at a time when 'carving' skis were only just starting to take off. A French company called Lacroix took an interest, recruited Thias Balmain, and started producing skwals. A few years later, Patrick left Lacroix and started his own skwal-making company. There are now several other makers of skwals, though the sport has never gained the widespread popularity its creators predicted - possibly due to the perceived difficulty of the sport.

== Bindings ==
Skwal bindings are specific. They were so specific that on the first public show in November 1992 in Les 2 Alpes, only the model made by Francois Seabright were useable. They were the only bindings adjustable in the 3 axis, enabling to find the perfect feet position for the rider. It moved on since then. They resemble those alpine snowboarding, but are usually thinner to fit the board which is very thin. The rear binding has a heel that creates a natural inclination for the rear foot. The front binding has a canting making an opposite inclination for the front foot.

== Boots ==
Alpine snowboarding hard boots are typically used for skwal. Feet must be held firmly but ankles need the flexibility to bend front and back. For comfort, the rear foot should be less tight than the front foot.

== See also ==
- Sport
  - Grass skiing
  - Water skiing
  - Winter sport
    - Snowshoe
    - Skiing
- Alpine skiing
- Freestyle skiing
- Mogul skiing
- Monoski
- Skiboarding
- Snowkiting
- Teleboard
