= Jack jumping =

Action sport

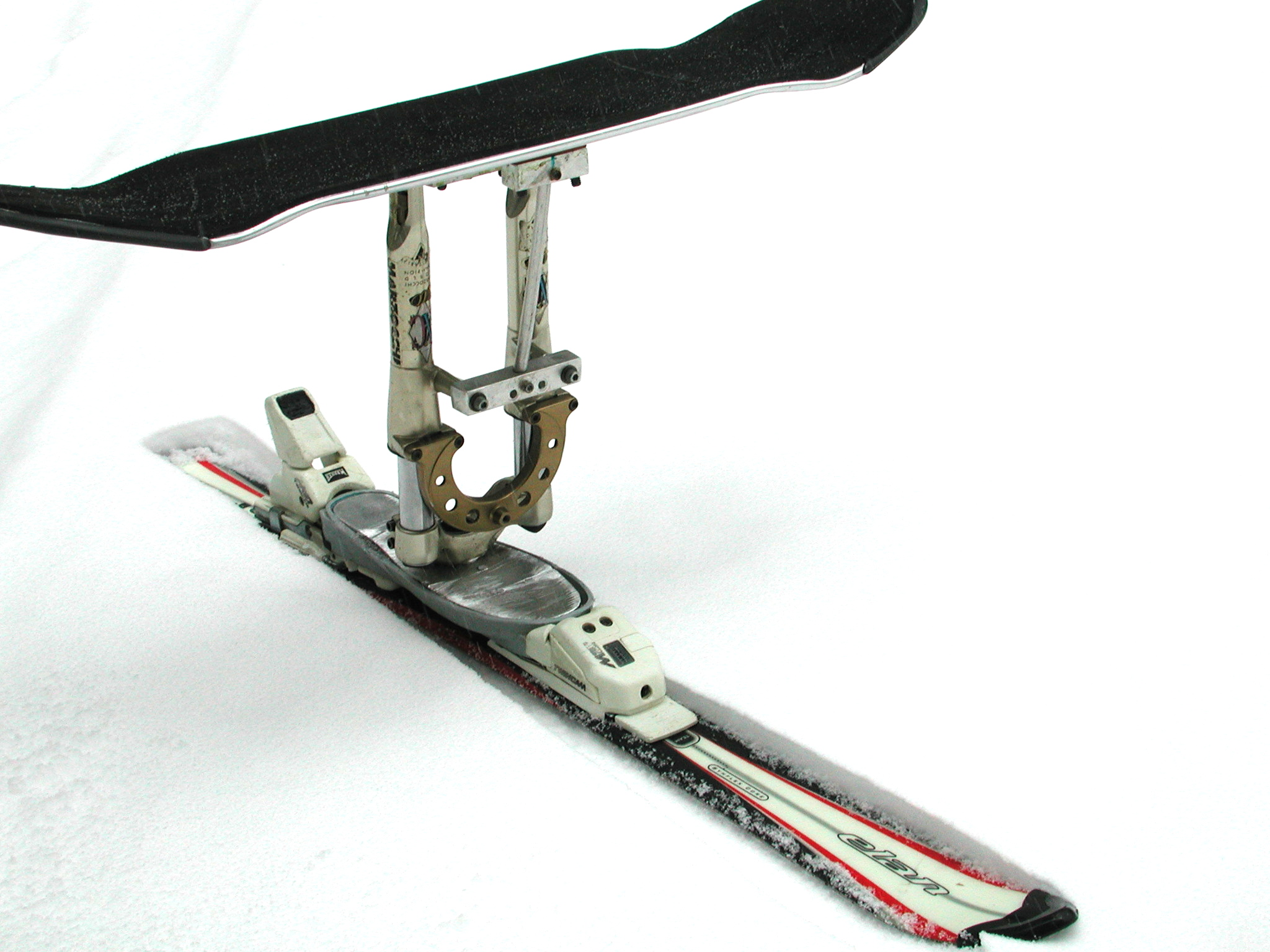
Modern jackjumper with air-shocks

Jack jumping, also known as Skibock in Europe, is an action sport that involves descending a slope that is covered with snow on a jackjumper. A jackjumper is a skiing device with a bench seat attached to a ski. The seat may be solidly mounted with a post, or sprung mounted with a shock-absorbing device. The origins of jack jumping, as well as its name, remain a mystery. The earliest jackjumpers date to the mid- to late 1800s. Early patents for jackjumpers were granted in the 1920s and the 1930s. Jackjumpers in the US, and Skibocks in Europe, are used today for both sport and recreation. There are numerous competitive events scheduled each year on both continents.

== History ==
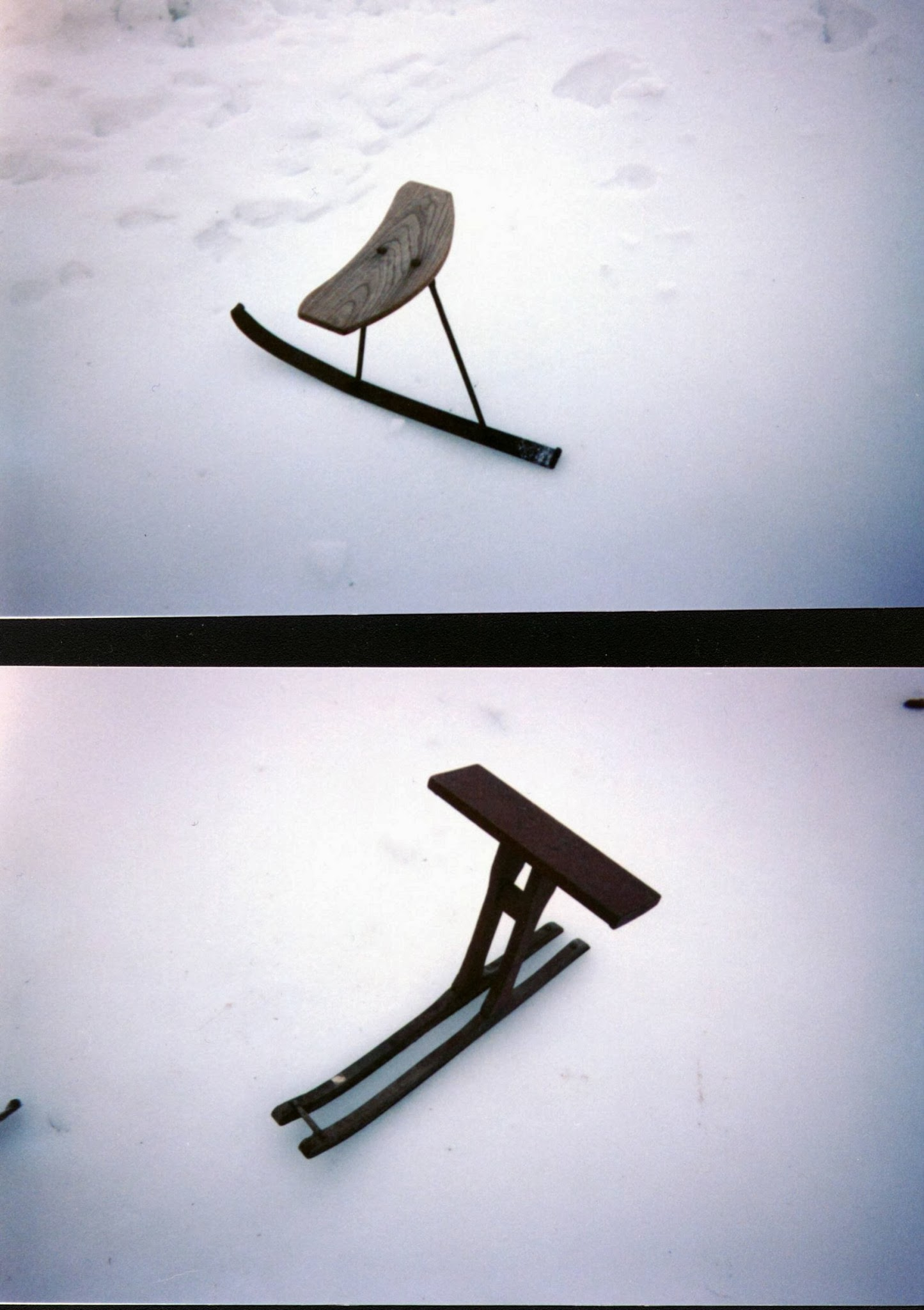
Antique jack jumpers

The earliest jackjumpers were made in New England in the mid- to late 1800s. While many early jackjumpers were homemade, jackjumpers that were manufactured in the late 1800s can be found in museums and private collections. The oldest patent issued for a jackjumper goes back to 1914. The first European patent was registered in 1929 in the Federal Institute of Intellectual Property (Switzerland).

There are many legends as to the origins of jack jumping. Some claim the earliest ones were made from barrel staves for skis and handcrafted wooden posts and seats. These jackjumpers are said to be used by loggers. Others say is originated as a toy for children to enjoy in the winter. Whatever the case of origin, both adults and children alike have enjoyed jackjumpers for over a century.

== Competition events ==
Most jackjumper competitions, such as the Jack Jump World Championships held at Mount Snow, Vermont each year are downhill slalom racing. Slalom jackjumping is similar to slalom skiing. Participants complete on downhill race course constructed by laying out a series of gates. In slalom competitions, two jackjumpers race downhill through sets of gates to the finish line.

In Europe The first Skibock World Championship took place on TschentenAlp on 19 March 2006.

Eaglebrook School in Deerfield, MA has been holding jackjumping races at their Winter Carnival for over eighty years.

== See also ==
- Monoski
- Skibobbing
