= Erich Brenter =

Austrian skibobber (1941–2024)

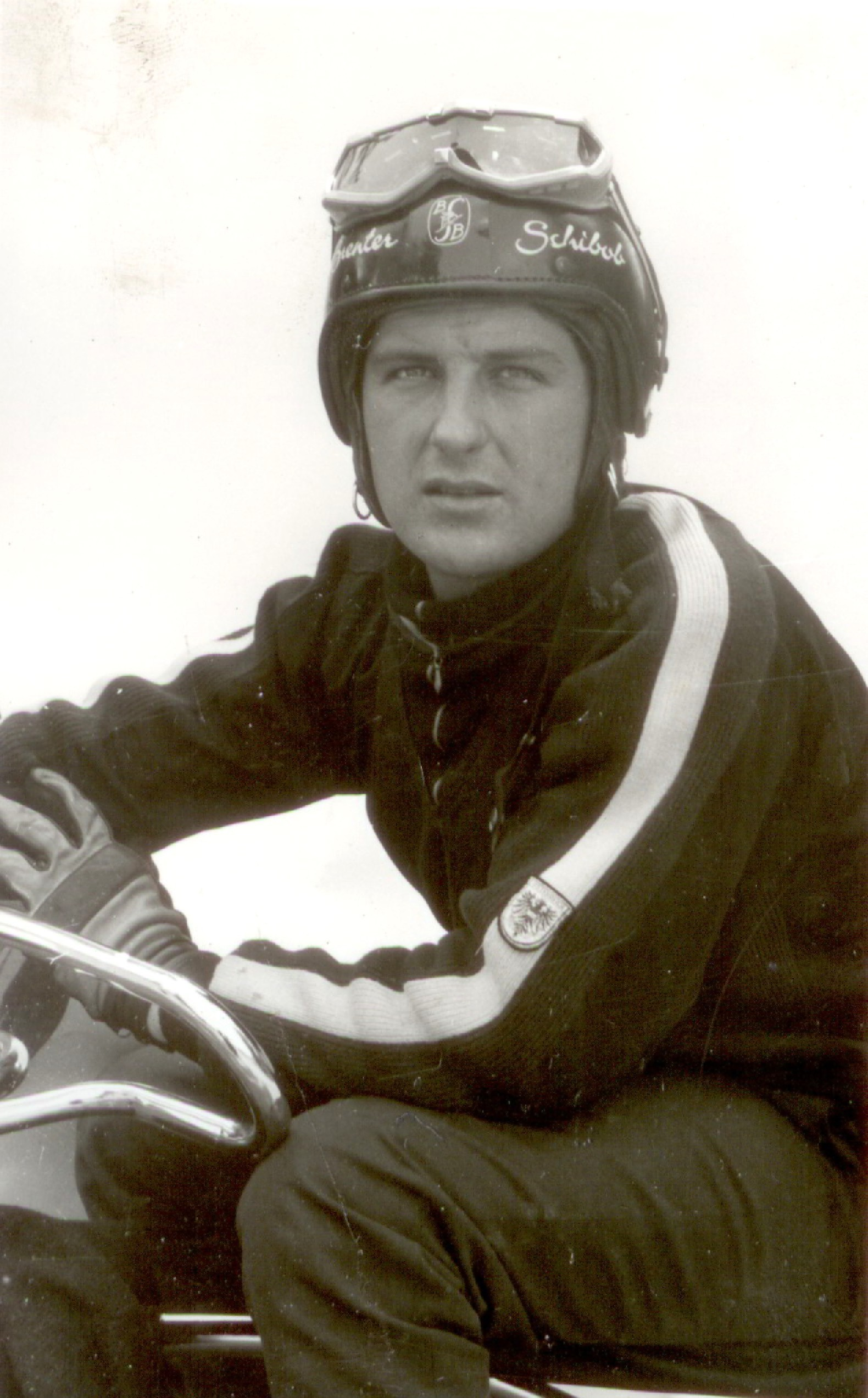
Erich Brenter in 1966

Erich Brenter (23 February 1941 – 2 April 2024) was an Austrian who was noted for his skill at skibobbing. In 1964 he set the world record for downhill skibobbing speed, with a recorded top speed of 102 miles per hour (164 km/h). He reportedly held that record for 30 years. He was married to a Norwegian named Ranheid and was CEO of Brenter Snowbike.
