= Para alpine skiing =

Skiing for people with disabilities

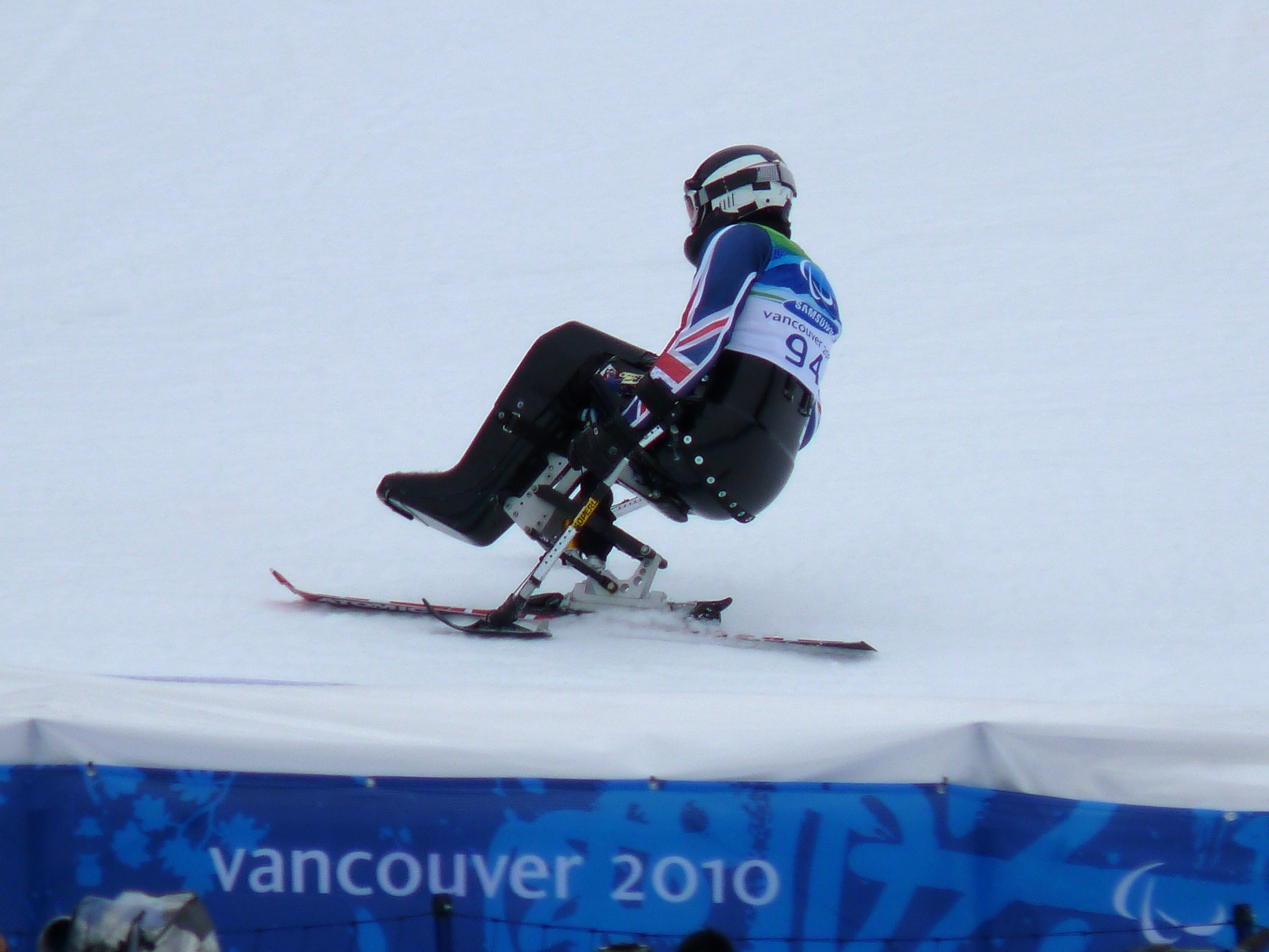
- Talan Skeels-Piggins from Great Britain in the first run for the men's slalom (sitting) at the 2010 Winter Paralympics in Vancouver, Canada.
- Highest governing body: International Paralympic Committee, International Ski Federation
- First played: 1967

Characteristics
- Team members: No
- Mixed-sex: No
- Type: Outdoor
- Equipment: skis, sit-skis or mono-skis, poles or outrigger skis, and boots, helmet, goggles

Presence
- Paralympic: Part of the Paralympics programme since 1976 Winter Paralympics

Para alpine skiing is an adaptation of alpine skiing for athletes with a disability. The sport evolved from the efforts of disabled veterans in Germany and Austria during and after the Second World War. The sport is governed by the International Paralympic Committee Sports Committee. The primary equipment used includes outrigger skis, sit-skis, and mono-skis. Para alpine skiing disciplines include the downhill, super-G, giant slalom, slalom, super combined, and snowboard.

Para alpine skiing classification is the classification system for Para alpine skiing designed to ensure fair competition between alpine skiers with different types of disabilities. The classifications are grouped into three general disability types: standing, blind and sitting. A factoring system was created for Para alpine skiing to allow the three classification groupings to fairly compete against each other in the same race despite different functional skiing levels and medical challenges.

Alpine skiing was one of the foundation sports at the first Winter Paralympics in 1976 with Slalom and giant slalom events being held. Different disciplines were added to the Paralympic programme over time. The 2010 Winter Paralympics Para alpine skiing events were held at Whistler Creekside. The disciplines at Whistler included downhill, super combined, super-G, slalom and giant slalom.

== History ==
Skiing as a sport for people with disabilities traces its origins back to the Second World War, which produced large numbers of wounded soldiers. In Germany, Franz Wendel, an amputee who had lost a leg, successfully attached a pair of crutches to short skis. Sepp "Peppi" Zwicknagel, an Austrian veteran who had lost both his legs to a hand grenade, taught himself to ski and eventually became a ski instructor at Kitzbühel, founded a division of the Austrian Ski Association for disabled skiers. By 1947, annual races were being held in Austria. Ludwig Guttmann, a key figure in the history of paralympic sport, helped organise ski events. In the United States, Gretchen Fraser began teaching skiing to amputees in army hospitals. By the 1960s, a number of organisations had been founded. For a long time, disability skiing was restricted to amputees, but in 1969, blind skier Jean Eymere, a former ski instructor before he lost his eyesight, began a skiing program in Aspen, Colorado for blind skiers. The first international competition, the World Disabled Alpine Championships, was held in France in 1974.

== Events ==
=== Paralympics ===
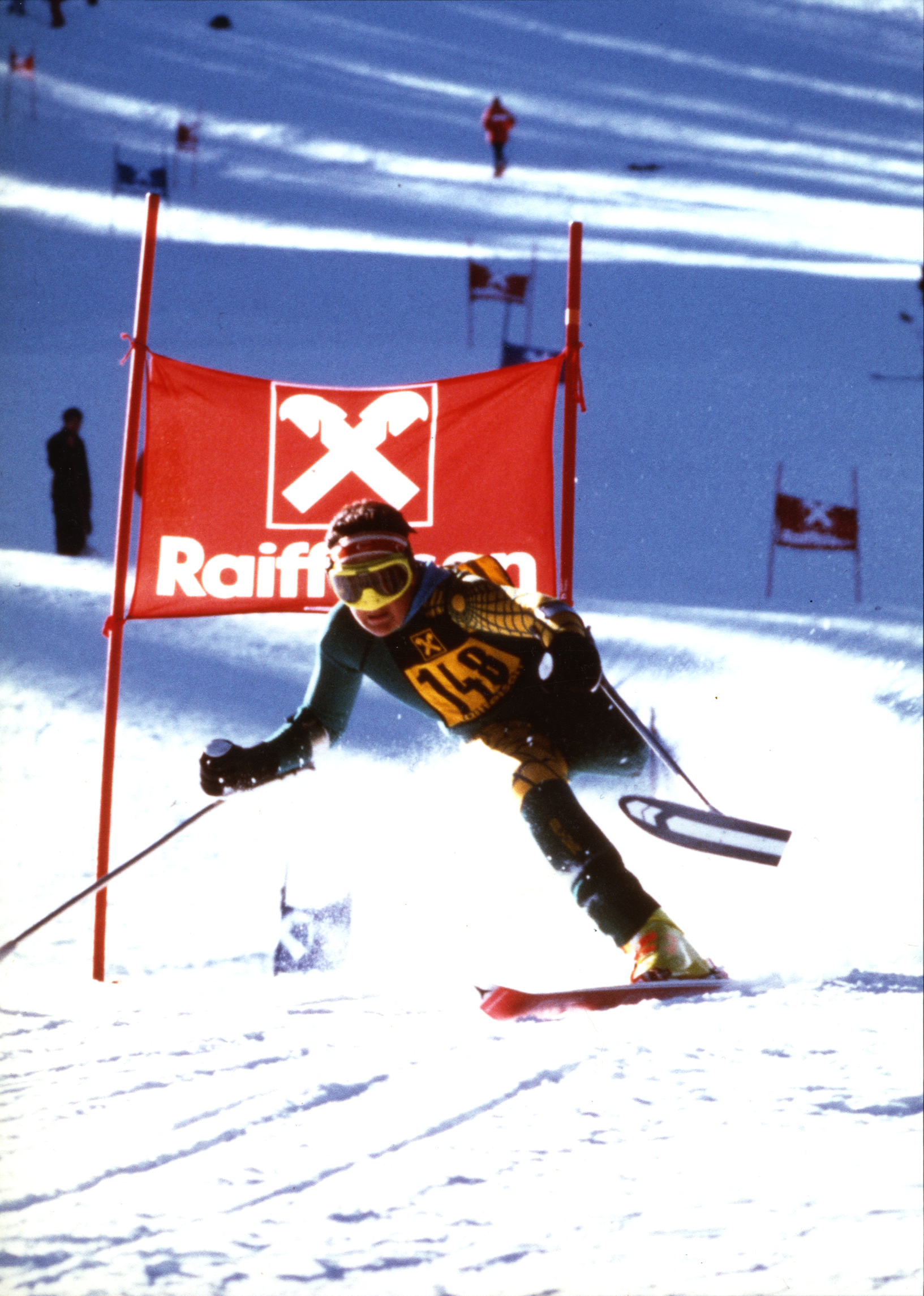
Australian Paralympian Michael Milton at the 1988 Innsbruck Winter Games.

Alpine skiing was one of the foundation sports at the first Winter Paralympics in 1976 with slalom and giant slalom events being held. At the 1984 Winter Paralympics, the downhill event was added to the Para alpine programme, along with sit-skiing as a demonstration sport. At the 1992 Winter Paralympics in Albertville, downhill, giant and slalom events were on the programme. At the 1994 Winter Paralympics, the super giant slalom was added to the Para alpine skiing programme. In 1998, Para alpine skiing classes for sitting and visually impaired skiers were added as full medal events after only having standing classes competing in previous Games.

At the 2002 Winter Paralympics, women's Downhill and men's visually impaired Downhill were held on day 1 with men's standing and sitting Downhill taking place on day 2. Men's standing and sitting Super-G took place on day 3, with men's visually impaired and women's Super-G taking place on day 5. Men's standing and sitting giant slalom took place on day 7, with women's and men's visually impaired giant slalom taking place on day 8. Men's standing and sitting Slalom took place on day 9, with women's and men's visually impaired Slalom taking place on day 10.

For the 2006 Winter Paralympics, major changes were made to the classification system used for the Games that combined the 14 classes used into three groups with the results factored across different classifications in the group. At those Games, in the Super-G, there were 55 male competitors compared to 18 women in the standing group.

The 2010 Winter Paralympics Para alpine skiing events were held at Whistler Creekside. The disciplines at Whistler included downhill, super-combined, super-G, slalom and giant slalom. It was the first time the super-combined was on the Paralympic programme. In the downhill event, there were 25 men and 18 women in the standing class, 25 men and 10 women in the sitting class and 12 men and 10 women in the vision impaired class. In the super-combined, there were 18 men and 14 women for standing, 18 men and 10 women for sitting and 10 men and 10 women for vision impaired. The Slalom race had the shortest course length of the major Para alpine events at the Games. The Downhill was held for both men and women in all classes on day 2. The Super-G was held for men and women in standing classes on day 3, with visual impaired and sit-skiers competing in the super-G on day 4. The Super Combined for all classes and both genders was held on day 5. The standing giant slalom for men and women was held on day 7 and the remaining classes on day 8. The Slalom was held for standing men and women on day 9 and remaining classes on day 10.

The 2014 Winter Paralympics Para alpine skiing took place at the Rosa Khutor Extreme Park. Added to this discipline these games was the Para snowboard cross which was held at Rosa Khutor along with the super-G, downhill, super-combined, slalom and giant slalom. In the downhill event for the visually impaired there were 11 men and 6 women. For the downhill standing, there were 17 men and 8 women. For the downhill sitting, 22 men and 6 women participated. In the Super-G for the visually impaired, there were 15 men and 6 women. The Super-G standing event had 31 men and 15 women. The Super-G sitting was contested by 31 men and 8 women. The men's and women's Super Combined Downhill and Super Combined Slalom took place on 11 March and both genders' Para snowboard cross events took place on 14 March.

== Governance, rules and events ==
International and national events for the sport include the Winter Paralympics, World Championships, World Cups, Continental Cups, National Championships, IPCAS Races and IPCAS Para snowboard. Skiers from 39 different countries actively compete in Para alpine skiing in a sport is that one of eight governed by the International Paralympic Committee Sports Committee, with rules for Para alpine skiing set forth in the IPCAS Rules and Regulations. Event specific rules may be created for events like the Paralympic Games. One set of rules was created in 1994 and were specified in the IPC Handbook. This was used to govern IPC-sanctioned events like the Paralympic Games for many years. Competition rules for classes use rules set by or modified from rules created by the International Ski Federation (ISF). These rules were set at the 42nd International Ski Conference in 2000. The two rule sets worked in concert with each other, with the ISF rules specifying the rules for alpine skiing, and the IPC providing modifications for Para alpine skiing. The IPC Alpine Sports Assembly Executive Committee can determine if skiers are eligible to compete in IPC sanctioned events at their own discretion regardless of what the rules say. National Paralympic Committees can have their own rule sets at national competitions.

== Equipment ==
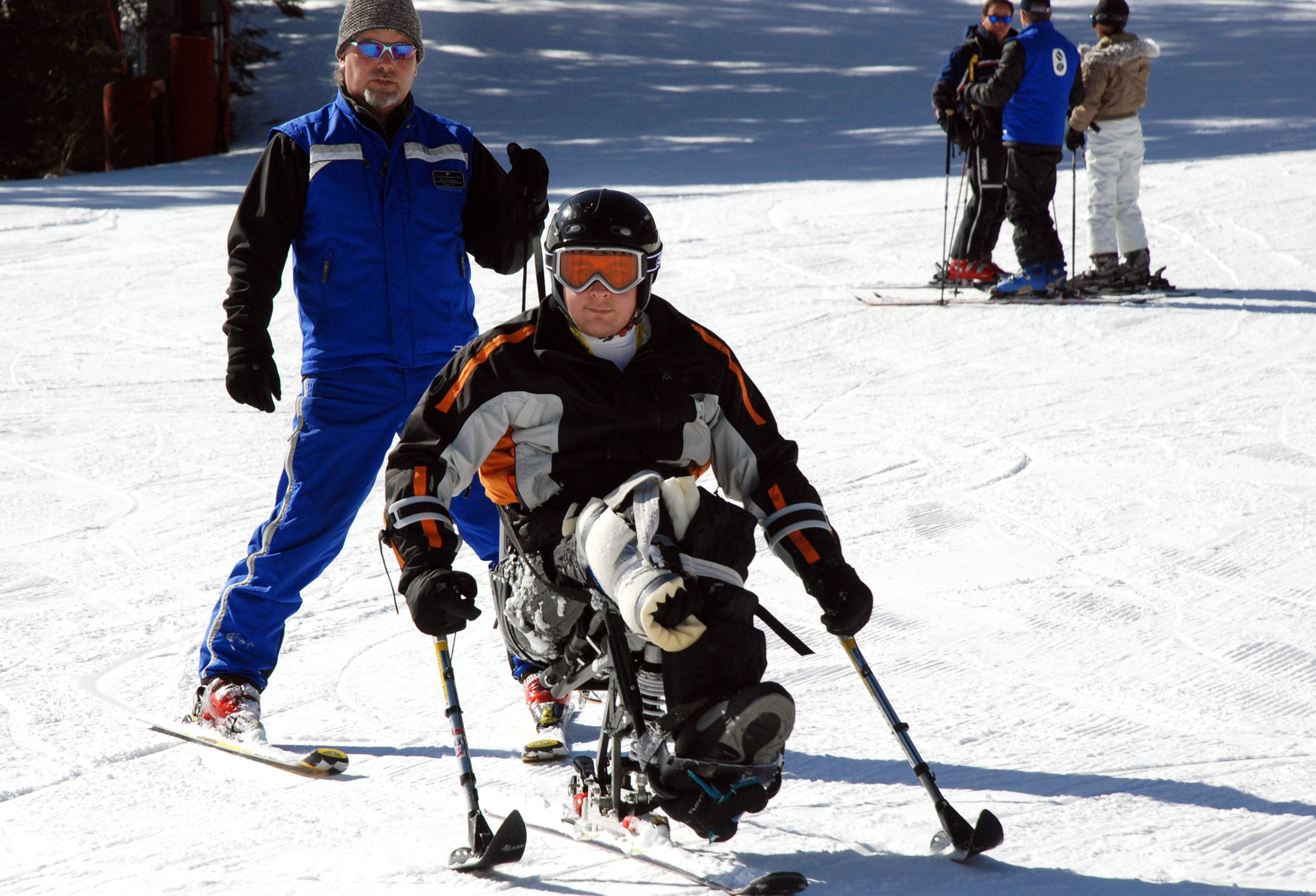
A disabled veteran uses a sit ski at Vail, Colorado.

=== Sitting ===
The primary equipment used in the sport includes outrigger skis, sit-skis, and mono-skis. Depending on the classification, other equipment may be used by skiers including guide skiers, cut-down ski poles, orthopedic aids, or prostheses. For standing skiers, different class rules determine what sort of equipment is allowed in competition, such as one pole, two poles or no poles, or one or two skis. Rules for equipment use in competition are set by FIS and the IPC.

There are minimum lengths for skis used in competition, with men's skis needing to be at least 165 centimetres (65 in) long and women's skis needing to be at least 155 centimetres (61 in) long. Bindings used for skis have a maximum height of 55 millimetres (2.2 in).

Sit-skis are designed for wheelchair users or other skiers with a form of paraplegia. The first sit-ski was built in 1967 by Josef Shrall from the Bavaria region of Germany. Early sit-skis used in Para alpine skiing had two wide skis, brakes, and were custom built to fit the specific skier. The weight of the ski prevented skiers from skiing moguls or steep slopes. Sit-ski development continued into the 1980s, with a more modern version demonstrated in Engelberg, Switzerland in 1987 at a workshop hosted by the Swiss Paraplegics Association. As the technology advanced, a chair was developed that could be attached to the skis which were used by non-disabled skiers. They are now made from fibreglass and polyester, and the weight has been dramatically reduced, allowing skiers to ski on steeper slopes and compete in the moguls. Current sit-skis include seat-belts. As skis for non-disabled skiers have evolved to specialise for the event, the skis that sit-skiers use have also changed.

Sit-skiers use a specially designed ski called a mono-ski, sometimes called a maxi mono-ski. It is used by skiers with lower limb disabilities including paralysis. A variation of the mono-ski exists for skiers with bilateral, above the knee amputations. The mono-ski was developed in Austria in the early 1980s by bilateral above-the-knee amputee Josef Feirsinger and engineer Horst Morokuti. The fundamental design they created is still the one used for mono-skis currently used in competition. The mono-ski was quickly used by German skiers who built their own at a workshop in Tübingen. The mono-ski uses the same skis used for non-disabled alpine skiing, adapted so that the skier sits on a chair attached to the ski via a spring. The mono-ski was first used at the 1988 Winter Paralympics.

A monoski, also known as a sit-ski, consists of a molded seat mounted on a metal frame. A shock absorber beneath the seat eases riding on uneven terrain and helps in turning by maximizing ski-snow contact. Modern monoskis interface with a single, ordinary alpine ski by means of a "ski foot," a metal or plastic block in the shape of a boot sole that clicks into the ski's binding. A monoskier uses outriggers for stability; an outrigger resembles a forearm crutch with a short ski on the bottom. People new to mono-skiing are often surprised to see how much terrain is skiable in a monoski; advanced monoskiers can be found not only carving turns on groomed runs but also skiing moguls, terrain parks, race courses, glades and even backcountry terrain—in short, wherever stand-up skiers can go.

As alpine ski technology has advanced, so has monoski technology. In North America in the 1970s and early 1980s, early "sit-skis" took the form of fiberglass sleds with metal runners. The first downhill sit-ski in the US, the Arroya, was invented by American Peter Axelson in 1978. Dragging very long poles or "slicks" in the snow were the method in which turns were actually made harder, although not effectively. Few users became proficient enough to descend even intermediate terrain without assistance from a "tetherer." By the early '80s, Europeans were experimenting with "ski-bobs" that mounted on two small skis. In place of today's minimal bucket seats were large fiberglass or Kevlar shells, and leaf springs at first were used instead of slide absorbers. The three-ski design proved accident prone, and it was soon abandoned for a single ski by most manufacturers. By the middle of the decade, the technology had migrated to Canada, and on both continents the modern monoski began to emerge. In the United States, Enabling Technologies' Unique, Sunrise Medical's Shadow, and Dan Fallon's Fallonski were some of the first commercially available monoskis. Praschberger (Austria), Tessier (France), and DynAccess (USA) are some of the major companies.

In 1984, monoskiers took part in the 1984 Innsbruck Paralympic Winter Games as a demonstration sport; in Innsbruck 1988, full medal categories were added for sitting skiers.

=== Standing ===
For standing competitors, outrigger skis can be used in some classifications. These are ski poles with small skis on the end. They assist a skier balancing as they ski down the slopes, and in moving uphill for short distances, enabling skiers to do things like a climb a slope to get on a chair lift.

=== Other equipment ===
Beyond this equipment, skiers also gear up wearing special boots, helmets, ski suits, and goggles. At the Paralympic Games, this equipment is prohibited from having advertisements on it. The boots attach to the ski at the heel and toe, and are designed to provide support to foot and ankle with the use of materials in boot construction like hard plastics. All helmets used in competition are required to be hard-shell helmets.

For skiers with visual impairments, guides are used to assist the skier down the course. Guides are skiers who do not have a vision impairment who assist a skier down the slopes by telling the skier where to go using their voice or a radio. Skiers can use more than one guide in the course of a competition, but the guide is only eligible for a medal if they have competed with the same skier for the duration of the discipline event. Like the skier, the guide is required to have an IPCAS Licence in order to participate in a competition and adhere to anti-doping rules.

== Disciplines ==
Para alpine skiing disciplines include the downhill, super-G, giant slalom, slalom, super combined, and snowboard. The rules for these disciplines are based on the rules set by the International Ski Federation, though some rules have been adapted for skiers with disabilities. While skiing in these disciplines, skiers can reach speeds of 100 kilometres (62 mi) an hour.

=== Downhill ===
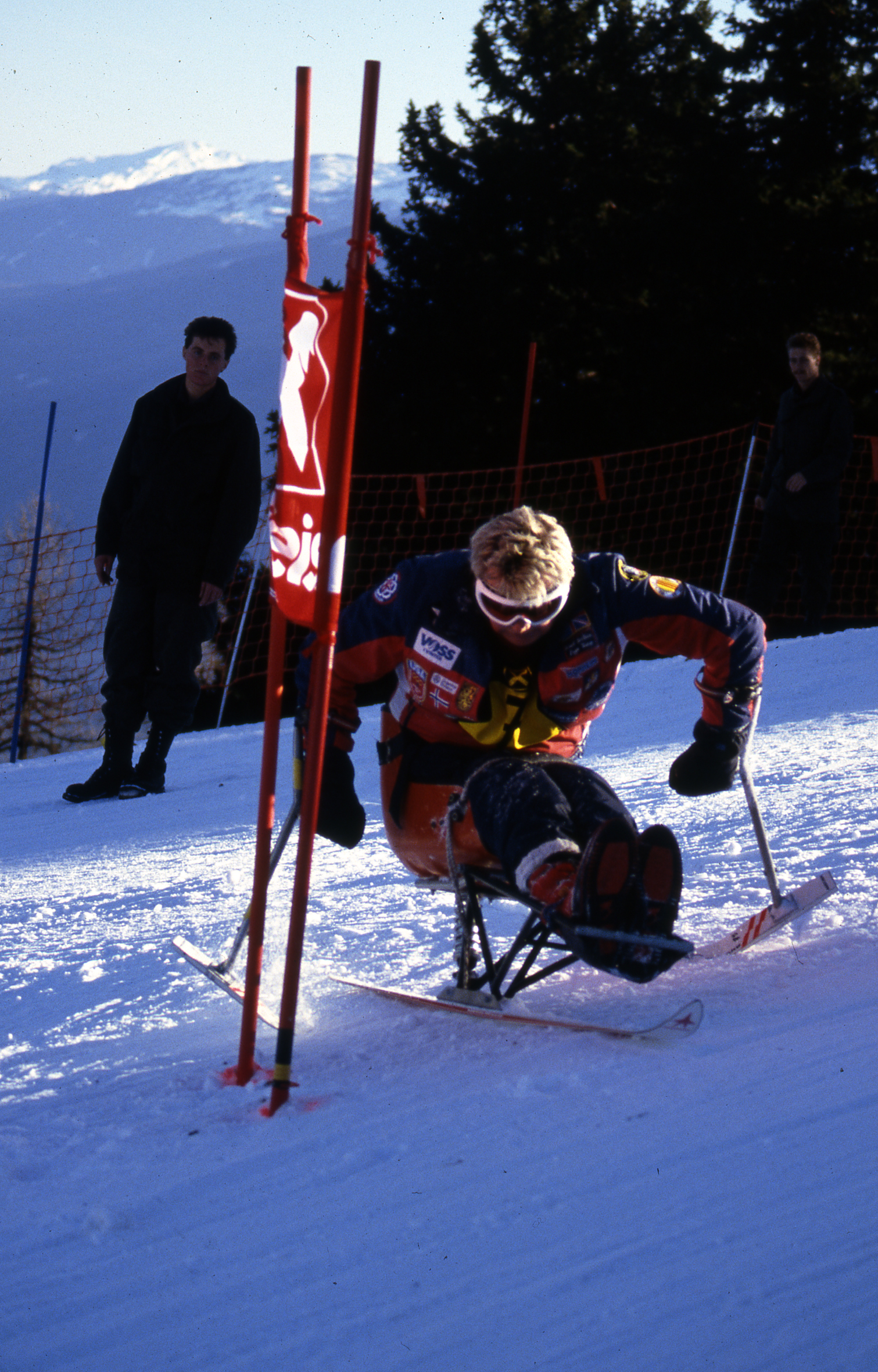
A Norwegian skier in the downhill at the 1988 Winter Paralympics

This is a speed based timed discipline, where competitors ski down a steep course that can finish 450 metres (1,480 ft) to 800 metres (2,600 ft) lower than it started while containing many turns and jumps. The winner is determined based on one run down the course, with the competitor with the fastest time being the winner. Skiers navigate between gates in the downhill, the fewest gates amongst all Para alpine disciplines, and if they miss a set, they are disqualified. In some competitions that require qualification for entry, a skier can qualify for this discipline through Downhill or Super-G. There are Disabled FIS points available in sanctioned events. This race is included on the current Paralympic programme.

Skis for women must be at least 200 centimetres (79 in) long with a tolerance of 1 centimetre (0.39 in). For men, the ski length must be at least 205 centimetres (81 in) long with the same tolerance. Women and men's skis need a minimum radius of 45 metres (148 ft). Skiers used curved ski poles for this event. Men and women both need their skis to have a profile radius of 67 millimetres (2.6 in). Top speeds in this event can be up to 100 kilometres (62 mi) an hour. Before the start of the event, the skier is required to do a practice run, and is required to wear a helmet during all their runs.

=== Super-G ===
Developed in the 1980s, the Super-G is less technical than others, and is known for the speed of the skier, who navigate a course that has a vertical drop between 400 metres (1,300 ft) to 600 metres (2,000 ft) from top to bottom. Compared to other Para alpine skiing disciplines, this course tends to be mid-length. It is longer than the giant slalom and the slalom but shorter than the downhill course. In this discipline, competitors ski between alternating red and blue gates that are 25 metres (82 ft) apart, with men needing to clear 35 gates and women needing to clear 30 gates. In some competitions that require qualification for entry, a skier can qualify for this discipline through Downhill, Slalom or Super-G. There are Disabled FIS points available in sanctioned events. This race is included on the current Paralympic programme.

Skis for women must be at least 200 centimetres (79 in) long with a tolerance of 1 centimetre (0.39 in). For men, the ski length must be at least 205 centimetres (81 in) long with the same tolerance. Women and men's skis need a minimum radius of 33 metres (108 ft). Men and women both need their skis to have a profile radius of 65 millimetres (2.6 in). Skiers used curved ski poles for this event.

=== Giant slalom ===
With a vertical drop of 300 metres (980 ft) to 400 metres (1,300 ft), this is one of the more technical of the Para alpine skiing disciplines. This discipline involves two runs down a course straighter and shorter than the downhill, but longer and having fewer turns than the slalom course. The winner is determined based on the combined time for both races. After the first run, the bottom 20% of finishers can be eliminated from the competition at the discretion of the judges. The starting order for the second run is starts with the slowest of the top 15 skiers, with the fastest skier in the first run skiing 15th. Any skiers who finished outside the top 15 then ski in order based on their times from the first run. For example, the 18th fastest finisher in the first run skis 18th in the second run. In some competitions, this is modified using 30 skiers instead of 15. The IPC/FIS run jointly sanctioned events for Slalom. This race is included on the current Paralympic programme. Skiers used straight ski poles for this event.

=== Slalom ===
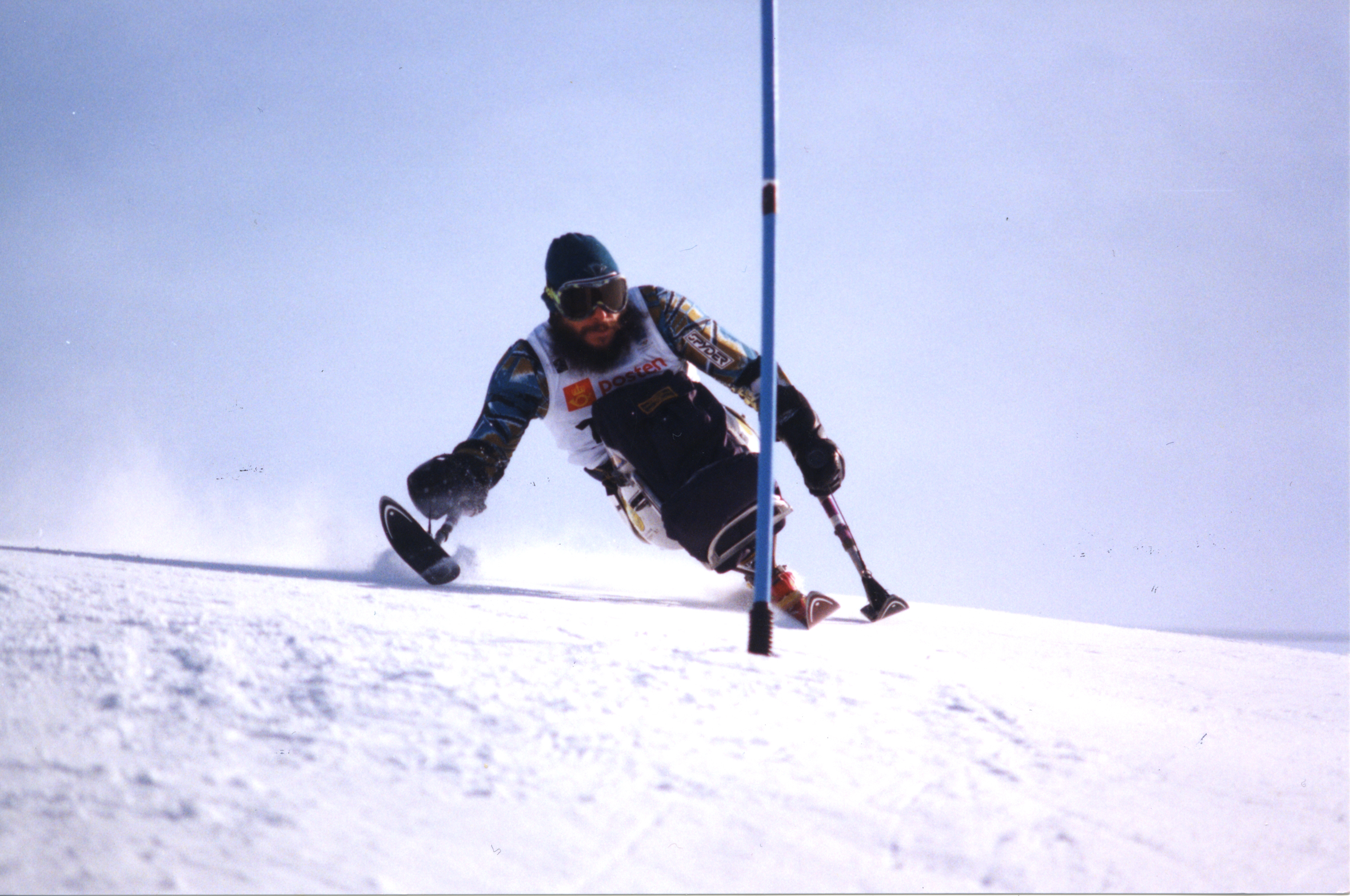
Australian Paralympic athlete Rod Hacon at the 1994 Winter Games in Lillehammer

The name for this event is from a Norwegian word meaning "sloping path." This event is the most technical Para alpine skiing disciplines, with a vertical drop of only 140 metres (460 ft) to 220 metres (720 ft) on an intentionally iced course. This is the shortest of all the Para alpine skiing events and uses two different courses. Skiers go down each course once, with their finishing position being determined based on their combined course completion time. There are gates in this event, about 55–75 for men and 40–60 for women, and if a skier misses a gate, they are disqualified from the race. After the first run, the bottom 20% of finishers can be eliminated from the competition at the discretion of the judges. The starting order for the second run is starts with the slowest of the top 15 skiers, with the fastest skier in the first run skiing 15th. Any skiers who finished outside the top 15 then ski in order based on their times from the first run. For example, the 18th fastest finisher in the first run skis 18th in the second run. Skiers used straight ski poles for this event. In some competitions that require qualification for entry, a skier can qualify for this discipline through Downhill, Slalom or Super-G. The IPC/FIS run jointly sanctioned events for Slalom. This race is included on the current Paralympic programme. Skiers often wear pads when competing in this discipline.

=== Super combined ===
The Super Combined event is a combination of two disciplines such as the slalom and the Super G, or the downhill and the slalom. In the event, skiers go down the downhill course once, and the slalom course twice. The times for the races are combined, with the fastest time winning.

=== Snowboard ===
Snowboard has vertical drops between 100 metres (330 ft) and 240 metres (790 ft) for both men's and women's races with the course being run over a distance of 400 metres (1,300 ft) to 900 metres (3,000 ft). The course has alternating gates. The sport is only open to standing competitors.

== Classification ==
Para alpine skiing classification is the classification system for Para alpine skiing designed to ensure fair competition between alpine skiers with different types of disabilities. The classifications are grouped into three general disability types: standing, blind and sitting. Classification governance is handled by International Paralympic Committee Alpine Skiing. Skiers are classified based on medical assessment, and their body position when they ski. Blind skiers are evaluated purely on a medical assessment. Prior to that, several sport governing bodies dealt with classification including the International Sports Organization for the Disabled (ISOD), International Stoke Mandeville Games Federation (ISMWSF), International Blind Sports Federation (IBSA) and Cerebral Palsy International Sports and Recreation Association (CP-ISRA). Some classification systems are governed by bodies other than International Paralympic Committee Alpine Skiing for systems not used in international competition. The sport is open to all competitors with a visual or physical disability. It is not open to people with intellectual disabilities.

The first classification systems for Para alpine skiing were developed in Scandinavia, with early systems designed for skiers with amputations. At the time, equipment had yet to be developed to allow participation for skiers with spinal cord injuries. The goal of the early classification systems was to be functional but ended up being medical classification systems. At the first Winter Paralympics in 1976, there were two classifications for the sport. By the 1980s, classification existed for skiers with cerebral palsy. At that time, with inspiration from wheelchair basketball classification, efforts were made to make classification more of a functional system. Ten classes existed by the 1980s, and since then, efforts have been made to improve the efficiency of classification by reducing the number of classes so fewer medals can be rewarded.

Standing classes
Class	Description	Typical equipment
LW 1	Double leg amputation above the knee, moderate to severe cerebral palsy, or equivalent impairment	Two skis, two outriggers
LW 2	Single leg amputation above the knee	One ski, two outriggers
LW 3	Double leg amputation below the knee, mild cerebral palsy, or equivalent impairment	Two skis, two poles
LW 4	Single leg amputation below the knee	Two skis, two poles
LW 5/7-1	Double arm amputation above the elbow	Two skis, no poles
LW 5/7-2	Double arm amputation, one above and one below the elbow	Two skis, no poles
LW 5/7-3	Double arm amputation below the elbow	Two skis, no poles
LW 6/8-1	Single arm amputation above the elbow	Two skis, one pole
LW 6/8-2	Single arm amputation below the elbow	Two skis, one pole
LW 9-1	Amputation or equivalent impairment of one arm and one leg above the knee	Choice of equipment
LW 9-2	Amputation or equivalent impairment of one arm and one leg below the knee	Choice of equipment

Sitting classes (monoskiers)
Class	Description
LW 10-1	Paraplegia with no upper abdominal function and no functional sitting balance
LW 10-2	Paraplegia with some upper abdominal function and no functional sitting balance
LW 11	Paraplegia with fair functional sitting balance
LW 12-1	Paraplegia with some leg function and good sitting balance
LW 12-2	Double leg amputation above the knees

Visually impaired classes
Class	Description
B1	Totally blind
B2	Visual acuity of less than 2/60
B3	Visual acuity of 2/60 to 6/60

== Factor system ==
A factoring system was created for Para alpine skiing to allow the grouping of classifications into three general groups: sitting, standing and visually impaired. One medal event can then be held for each group even though there is a wide range of functional mobility and medical differences. The factoring system works by having a number for each class based on their functional mobility or vision levels, where the results are calculated by multiplying the finish time by the factored number. The resulting number is the one used to determine the winner in events where the factor system is used. This means the faster skier down a hill may not be the winner of an event.

The factoring system is used at several Para alpine skiing competitions including the Alpine Cup, North American Races, European Cup, World Cup events, World Championships, and the Winter Paralympics. Disciplines use factored results to combine classes unless there are six or more skiers competing in a specific class.

== See also ==
- World Para Alpine Skiing World Cup
