= Wheelchair basketball classification =

Disability sport classification system

Wheelchair basketball classification is the system that allows for even levels of competition on the court for wheelchair basketball based on functional mobility. The classifications for the sport are 1 point player, 2 point player, 3 point player, 4 point player and 4.5 point player, the greater the player's functional ability. Classification for the sport is set by the International Wheelchair Basketball Federation.

== Definition ==
Classification in wheelchair basketball plays an important role in the sport as the classification uses total points of players to determine who can be on the court. The classifications for the sport are 1 point player, 2 point player, 3 point player, 4 point player and 4.5 point player. The higher the point number, the greater the player's functional ability. With five players on the court, the total number of points may not exceed fourteen. There has been sustained criticism of the classification system as being overly complex from players, coaches and leagues. These criticisms have been documented in academic research published in 1986, 1990, 1995 and 1997.

== Governance ==
Classification for the sport is set by the International Wheelchair Basketball Federation (IWBF). Going into the 2012 Summer Paralympics, the classification system dates to 2004 and was created by the IWBF Player Classification Commission. In 1999, the United States-based National Wheelchair Basketball Association governed over their own wheelchair basketball classification system because they did not like the system used by the IWBF, finding it too complex. The system they use and oversee is based on a classification assigning players a maximum of three points. Historically, the IWBF has had a good and close relationship with the Federation Internationale de Basketball Association. At the same time, IWBF have striven to maintain independent governance of the sport.

== Eligibility ==
As of 2012, people with physical disabilities are eligible to compete in this sport. To be eligible to play wheelchair basketball, competitors must have a physical limitation that prevents them from being able to "run, pivot, or jump at speed and with control, safety, stability, and endurance of a nondisabled player; and have a permanent physical disability in the lower limb that can be objectively verified by acknowledged medical or paramedical investigations such as measurement, X-ray, CT, MRI, and so on." Lower leg amputation competitors are allowed to participate in wheelchair sport following classification rules for them based on functional mobility.

== History ==
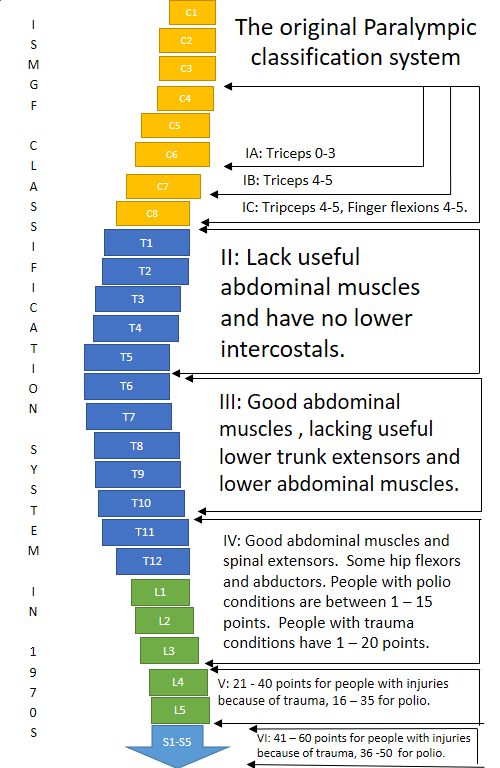
The original ISMGF classification system used at early Paralympic Games.

Early classification for the sport was managed by ISMGF and was a medical classification system with three classes. The original wheelchair basketball classification system in 1966 had 5 classes: A, B, C, D, S. Each class was worth a certain amount of points. A was worth 1, B and C were worth 2, and D and S were worth 3 points. A team could have a maximum of 12 points on the floor. This system was the one in place for the 1968 Summer Paralympics. Class A was for T1-T9 complete. Class B was for T1-T9 incomplete. Class C was for T10-L2 complete. Class D was for T10-L2 incomplete. Class S was for Cauda equina paralysis. During the 1970s, a debate began to take place in the physical disability sport community about the merits of a medical versus functional classification system. During this period, people had strong feelings both ways but few practical changes were made to existing classification systems.

From 1969 to 1973, a classification system designed by Australian Dr. Bedwell was used. This system used some muscle testing to determine which class incomplete paraplegics should be classified in. It used a point system based on the ISMGF classification system. Class IA, IB and IC were worth 1 point. Class II for people with lesions between T1-T5 and no balance were also worth 1 point. Class III for people with lesions at T6-T10 and have fair balance were worth 1 point. Class IV was for people with lesions at T11-L3 and good trunk muscles. They were worth 2 points. Class V was for people with lesions at L4 to L5 with good leg muscles. Class IV was for people with lesions at S1-S4 with good leg muscles. Class V and IV were worth 3 points. The Daniels/Worthington muscle test was used to determine who was in class V and who was class IV. Paraplegics with 61 to 80 points on this scale were not eligible. A team could have a maximum of 11 points on the floor.

During the 1960s and 1970s, ISMGF classification cheating occurred in both swimming and wheelchair basketball. Some of the medical classifications for both many sportspeople appeared arbitrary, with people of different functional levels being put into the same class. This made the results for many games and swimming races appear to be completely arbitrary. Impacted sportspeople were starting to demand that changes be made to address this. The German men and women's national wheelchair basketball teams were leading the charge in this regard, offering to test out and actually testing new systems that were being developed by Cologne based Horst Strokhkendl. This process started in 1974 with a final report being written in 1978. Despite the report being submitted to ISMGF, no changes were made for years.

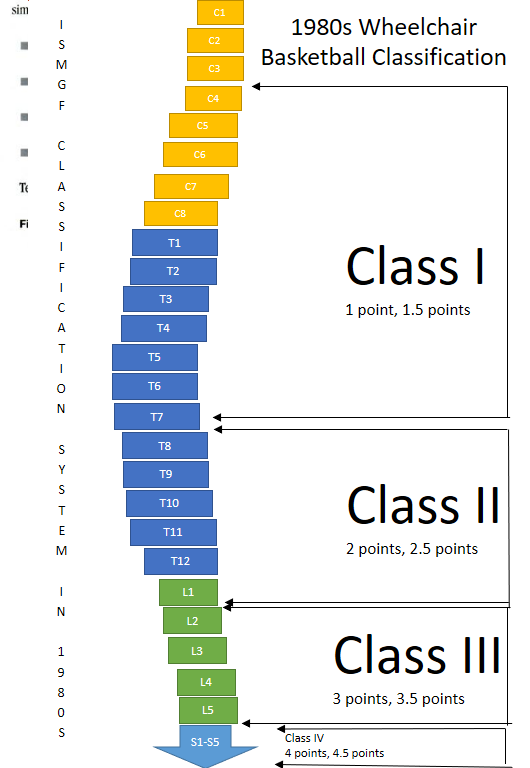
The wheelchair basketball classification system used during the 1980s was mostly functional, but had medical lesion based elements as a guideline. A maximum of 14 points was allowed on the floor at any time.

Wheelchair basketball was the first disability sport to use a functional classification system instead of a medical classification system. Early experiments with this type of classification system in basketball began during the 1980s. In 1982, wheelchair basketball finally made the move to a functional classification system internationally. While the traditional medical system of where a spinal cord injury was located could be part of classification, it was only one advisory component. The first demonstration of the system used at the 1983 Gold Cup Championships. At the time, there were four classes for the sport. The competition demonstrated that ISMGF medical classifiers had issues with correctly placing players into classes that best represented their ability. The new system increased player confidence and reduced criticism of the classification system as it pertained to accusations that players had been incorrectly classified. The functional classification system used at the 1983 Gold Cup Championships was developed in Cologne based Horst Strokhkendl. This system is the one that has been used consistently in the international community since then. It was subsequently used at the 1984 World Games for the Disabled in England. The introduction of a functional classification system also meant that for the first time, amputee players could participate in the sport. Despite the system being in place in time for the 1984 and 1988 Summer Paralympics, a decision was made to delay its use at the Paralympic Games until 1992, where it was used for the first time. This was in part a result of conflict between broader ISMGF and the Wheelchair Basketball Subcommittee. The ISMGF was opposed in some measure to fully moving to a functional classification system for the sport. This conflict would not officially resolve itself until 1986, when the United States men and women threatened to boycott major tournaments unless the functional system was fully implemented.

In 1992, the International Paralympic Committee formally took control of governance for disability sport and oversaw the classification systems as part of a review for any sport seeking IPC recognition. The debate about inclusion of competitors into able-bodied competitions was seen by some disability sport advocates like Horst Strokhkendl as a hindrance to the development of an independent classification system not based on the rules for able-bodied sport. These efforts ended by 1993 as the International Paralympic Committee tried to carve out its own identity and largely ceased efforts for inclusion of disability sport on the Olympic programme. The Games were the first ones where basketball players of different types of disabilities competed against each other, basketball players had a guaranteed right to appeal their classification.

Because of issues in objectively identifying functionality that plagued the post Barcelona Games, the IPC unveiled plans to develop a new classification system in 2003. This classification system went into effect in 2007, with standards based around identifying impaired strength, limb deficiency, leg length differences, and stature. It also included ways to assess vision impairment and intellectual impairment.

== Sports ==
At times, players may not easily fit into the standard full point classifications. For this reason, they can be classified in between, such as 1.5 points, 2.5 points, and 3.5 points. Classifiers are discouraged from assigning this half point classification as a competitor's initial classification. Performance wise, 4 point players can move their wheelchairs at a significantly faster speed than 1 point players. There is also a significant difference in special endurance between 2 point players, and 3 and 4 point players, with 2 point players having less special endurance. In standard endurance, there is little significant difference between the different point classifications. Across all point classes, there is little difference in ability to perform an envelope agility test. In games, 4 point players steal the ball three times more often than 1 point players. 4 point players generally have the greatest number of rebounds on the court because of competitive advantage when under the basket in terms of height, stability and strength. 4 point players turn over the ball with much greater frequency than 1 point players. 1 point and 2 point players handle the ball the least on court.

With a maximum of 14 points allowed to be on the floor at any time, teams may differ their point allocation based on the situation of the game. Having three 4 point players and two 1 point players involves the lower tiered players fulfilling the role of setting screens, while the higher tiered players create shots to bring the team back in the game. On the other hand, a team may choose to allocate their points in a more balanced manner to allow for increased mobility and handling.

== Process ==
Classification appeals are handled by the IWBF. During the classification process, a player is asked to propose what classification they think they should be classified as. Once classified, changes in classification can only be made if there is unanimous decision amongst those who did the classification.

In most countries, classification for national competitions is done through the local national Paralympic committee. For Australian competitors in this sport, the sport and classification is managed the national sport federation with support from the Australian Paralympic Committee. There are three types of classification available for Australian competitors: Provisional, national and international. The first is for club level competitions, the second for state and national competitions, and the third for international competitions.

== Paralympic Games ==
Only wheelchair classified athletes were eligible to compete at the 1960 Summer Paralympics in Rome in this sport. At the 1992 Summer Paralympics, wheelchair, amputee and cerebral palsy disability types were eligible to participate, with classification being run through an independent classification body, with classification being done based on functional ability. General and functional classification took place in the Paralympic Village in block 2 from 29 to 31 August. At the 2000 Summer Paralympics, 23 assessments were conducted at the Games. This resulted in 7 class changes. There were 5 protests by PPS with all 5 classifications being upheld. There were 4 classification appeals lodged for wheelchair basketball at the 2000 Summer Paralympics involving 2 athletes which resulted in 2 class changes. For the 2016 Summer Paralympics in Rio, the International Paralympic Committee had a zero classification at the Games policy. This policy was put into place in 2014, with the goal of avoiding last minute changes in classes that would negatively impact athlete training preparations. All competitors needed to be internationally classified with their classification status confirmed prior to the Games, with exceptions to this policy being dealt with on a case by case basis. In case there was a need for classification or reclassification at the Games despite best efforts otherwise, wheelchair basketball classification was scheduled for 4 to 6 September at Carioca Arena 1.

== Future ==
Going forward, disability sport's major classification body, the International Paralympic Committee, is working on improving classification to be more of an evidence-based system as opposed to a performance-based system so as not to punish elite athletes whose performance makes them appear in a higher class alongside competitors who train less.
