= Monoski =

Type of ski

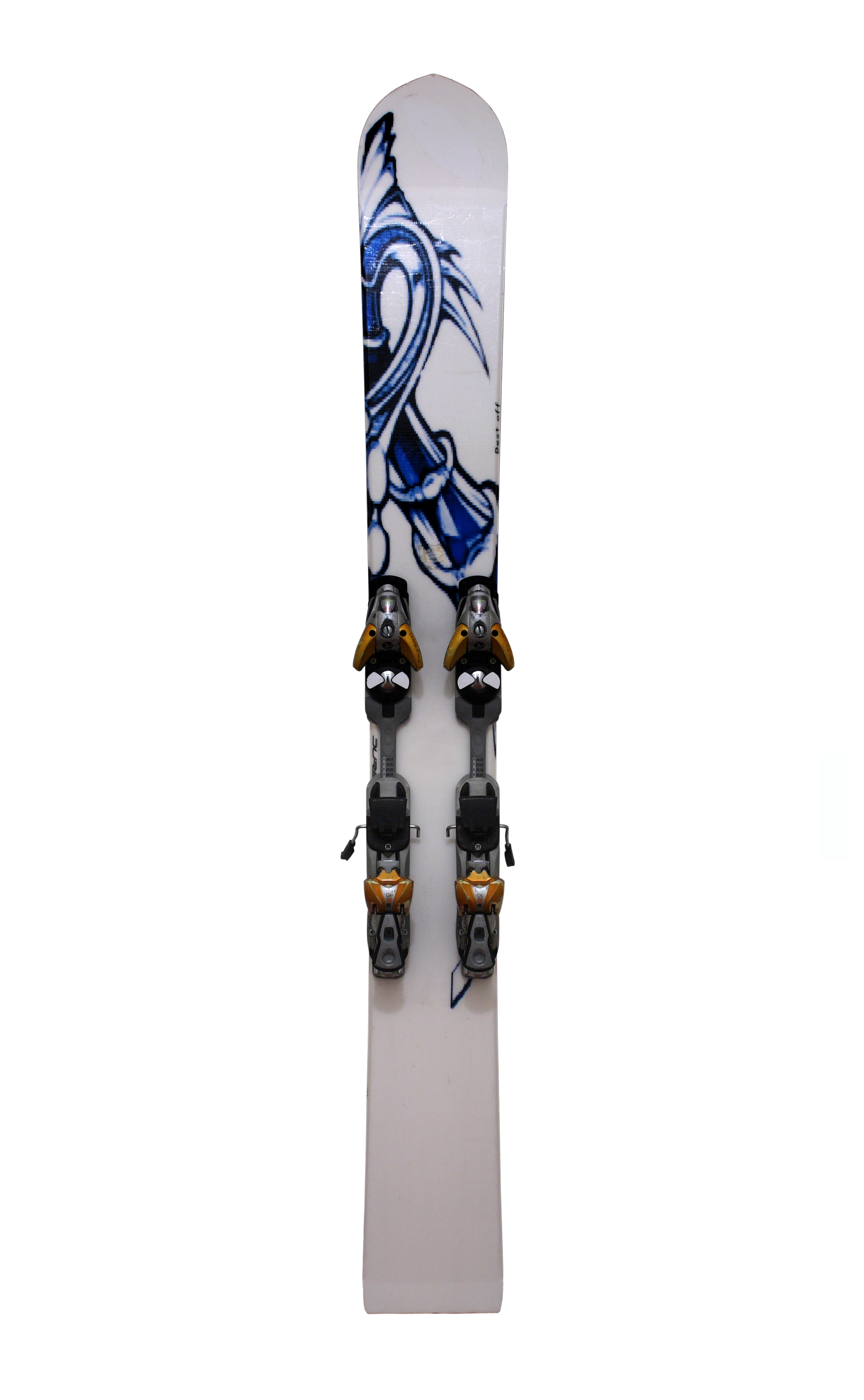
A (standup) monoski

A monoski is a single wide ski used for skiing on snow. The same boots, bindings, and poles are used as in alpine skiing. Unlike in snowboarding, both feet face forward, rather than sideways to the direction of travel. Similar equipment includes the skwal and the teleboard, with feet in tandem formation (one ahead of the other).

Recently the popularity of monoskiing has increased, particularly in France and in the United States largely due to technological advances in the design of the ski. As with alpine skis, the sidecut of the ski has meant easier turns.

== History ==
Monoskiing was invented in the late 1950s by Dennis Phillips at Hyak, Washington using a single water ski and bear trap bindings. In 1964 Jacques Marchand was granted a U.S. patent for a "Mono ski". Surfer Mike Doyle promoted the monoski in the early 1970s, after which monoskiing's relative popularity slowly increased, but the interest eventually waned in favor of snowboarding.

== Festivals ==
Fans of monoskiing arrange festivals during the season to try out new skis and hold competitions.

- France hosts the "Mondial de Monoski", and the "Monoski World Championships" held each April in Val d'Isere.
- United States hosts the "Monopalooza", one of the largest monoskiing events, held annually at different resorts, such as Jackson hole and lake Tahoe.
- "Cinco de Mono" is an event held in the three Colorado resorts, Winter Park, Loveland, and Arapahoe Basin, on the Cinco de Mayo weekend.
