= T47 (classification) =

Para-athletics classification

T47 is a disability sport classification for disability athletics primarily for competitors with a below elbow or wrist amputation or impairment. T47 is a classification for track events, but unlike the other T40 to T46 classifications, it has no equivalent F47 classification for field events. The amputee sports equivalent class is ISOD the A8 class. People in this class can have injuries due to overuse of their remaining upper limb.

== Definition ==
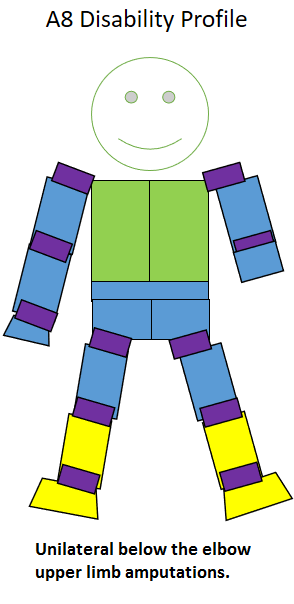
Type of amputation for an A8 classified sportsperson.

This classification is for disability athletics. This classification is one of several classifications for athletes with ambulant-related disabilities. Similar classifications are T40, T42, T43, T44, T45 and T46. As of 2016, the International Paralympic Committee defines this classification as being for athletes with a unilateral upper limb impairment resulting in some loss of function at the shoulder, elbow and wrist and which impacts sprints primarily. The impact of the impairment is comparable to the activity limitations experienced by an athlete with a unilateral through wrist/below elbow amputation. This class includes people from the ISOD A8 class.

== Disability groups ==
=== Amputees ===
The nature of a person's amputations in this class can affect their physiology and sports performance. Because they are missing a limb, amputees are more prone to overuse injuries in their remaining limbs. Common problems for intact upper limbs for people in this class include rotator cuffs tearing, shoulder impingement, epicondylitis and peripheral nerve entrapment.

A study compared the performance of athletics competitors at the 1984 Summer Paralympics when the ISOD classification system was used. It found there was no significant difference in performance in times between women in A6, A7 and A8 in the discus, women in A6, A7, and A8 in the shot put, women in the A6, A7 and A8 in the long jump, women in A6, A7 and A8 in the 100-meter race, women in A5, A6, A7 and A8 in the 100-meter race, men in the A3, A4, A5, A6, A7, A8 and A9 in the discus, men in A6, A7 and A8 in the discus, men in A1, A2, A3, A4, A5, A6, A7, A8 and A9 in the javelin, men in A6, A7 and A8 in the javelin, men in A8 and A9 in the shot put, men in A6, A7, and A8 in the high jump, men in A6, A7, and A8 in the long jump, men in A6, A7, and A8 in the 100-meter race, men in A7 and A8 in the 400-meter race, and men in A7 and A8 in the 1,500-meter race.

== Performance and rules ==
People in this class are not required to use a starting block. They can start from a standing position, a crouch, or a 3-point stance. In relay events involving T40s classes, no baton is used. Instead, a handoff takes place via touch in the exchange zone. People with arm amputations in this class can have elevated padded blocks to place their stumps on for the start of the race. These blocks need to be in a neutral color or a color similar to that of the track, and they must be placed entirely behind the starting line. Their location needs to be such that they do not interfere with the start of any other athlete.

Athletes are not required to wear prosthetics for this class during field events. In jumping events, athletes have 60 seconds to complete their jump. During this time, they can adjust their prosthetic. If, during a jump, the athlete's prosthesis falls off and lands closer to the takeoff board than the athlete, the mark is taken where the prosthesis landed. If the prosthesis falls off outside the landing zone nearer the board than where the athlete landed, the jump counts as a foul.

== Events ==
Qualification standards for the 2016 Summer Paralympics
Event	Men		Women	
Event	AQS	BQS	AQS	BQS
100 metres	11.25	11.60	13.60	14.60
200 metres	22.50	23.50	28.00	29.00
400 metres	50.80	53.50	1:06.00	1:15.00
Long jump	6.45	6.10	4.45	4.00
High jump	1.65	1.50	—	

== History ==
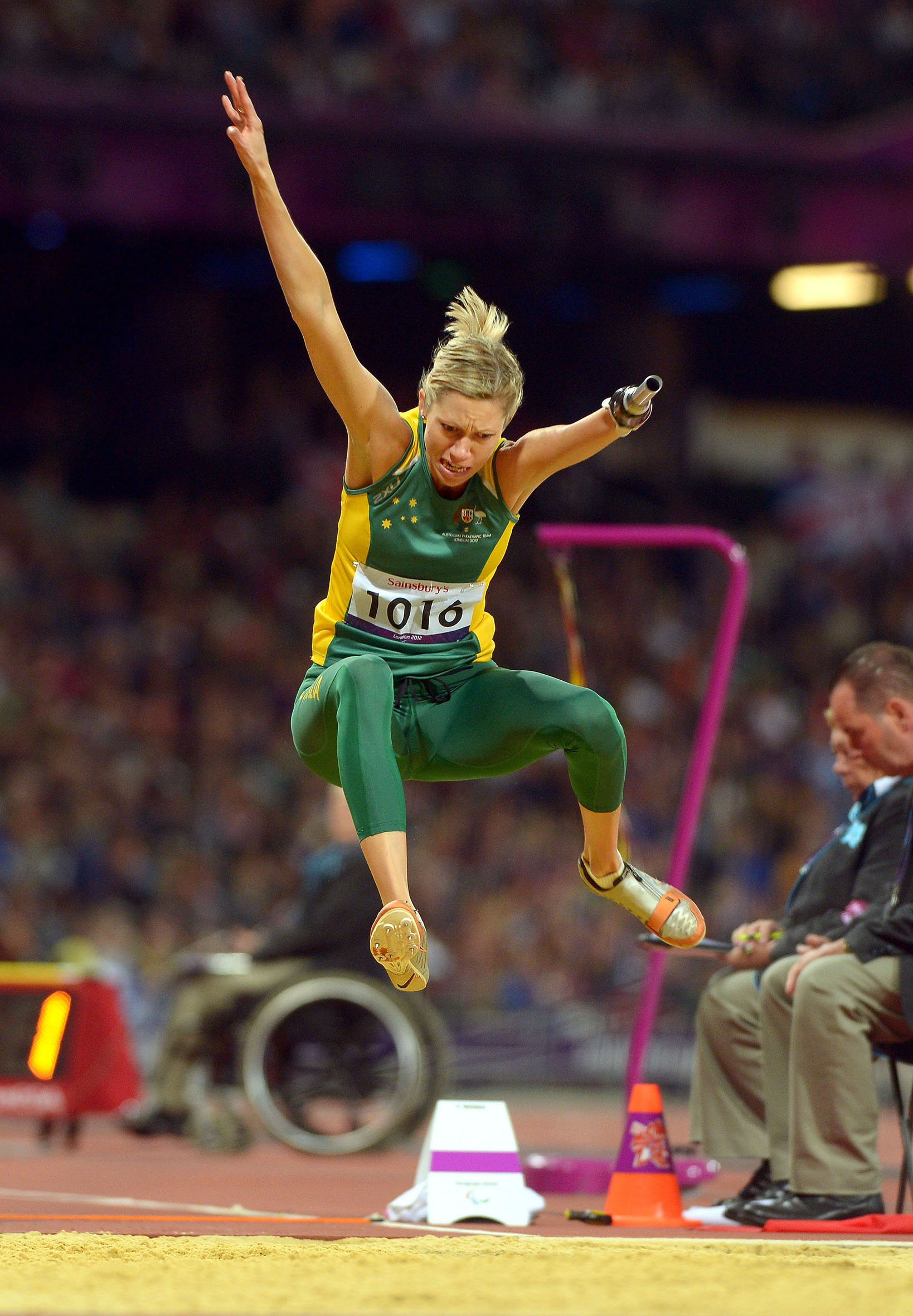
Australian long jumper Carlee Beattie is a T47 athlete.

The classification was created by the International Paralympic Committee (IPC) and had roots in a 2003 attempt to address "the overall objective to support and coordinate the ongoing development of accurate, reliable, consistent and credible sport-focused classification systems and their implementation." T47 was created in 2013 as an additional classification to the T45 and T46 classifications for competitors whose primary impairments are in the upper limbs.

The IPC had a zero classification at the Games policy for the 2016 Summer Paralympics in Rio de Janeiro. This policy was implemented in 2014 to avoid last-minute class changes negatively impacting athlete training preparations. All competitors needed to be internationally classified, with their classification status confirmed before the Games, with exceptions to this policy being dealt with on a case-by-case basis. In case there was a need for classification or reclassification at the Games despite best efforts otherwise, athletics classification was scheduled for September 4 and September 5 at Olympic Stadium. For sportspeople with physical or intellectual disabilities going through classification or reclassification in Rio, their in-competition observation event is their first appearance in competition at the Games.

== Becoming classified ==
Classification is often based on the anatomical nature of the amputation. The classification system takes several things into account when putting people into this class; these include which limbs are affected, how many limbs are affected, and how much of a limb is missing.

For this class, classification generally has four phases. The first stage of classification is a health examination. For amputees, this is often done on-site at a sports training facility or competition. The second stage is observation in practice, the third stage is observation in competition, and the last stage is assigning the sportsperson to a relevant class. Sometimes, the health examination may not be done on-site because the nature of the amputation could cause not physically visible alterations to the body.

== Competitors ==
Notable athletes in the T47 classification include South African sprinter Anrune Weyers and world record long jumper Carlee Beattie of Australia.
