= T46 (classification) =

Para-athletics classification

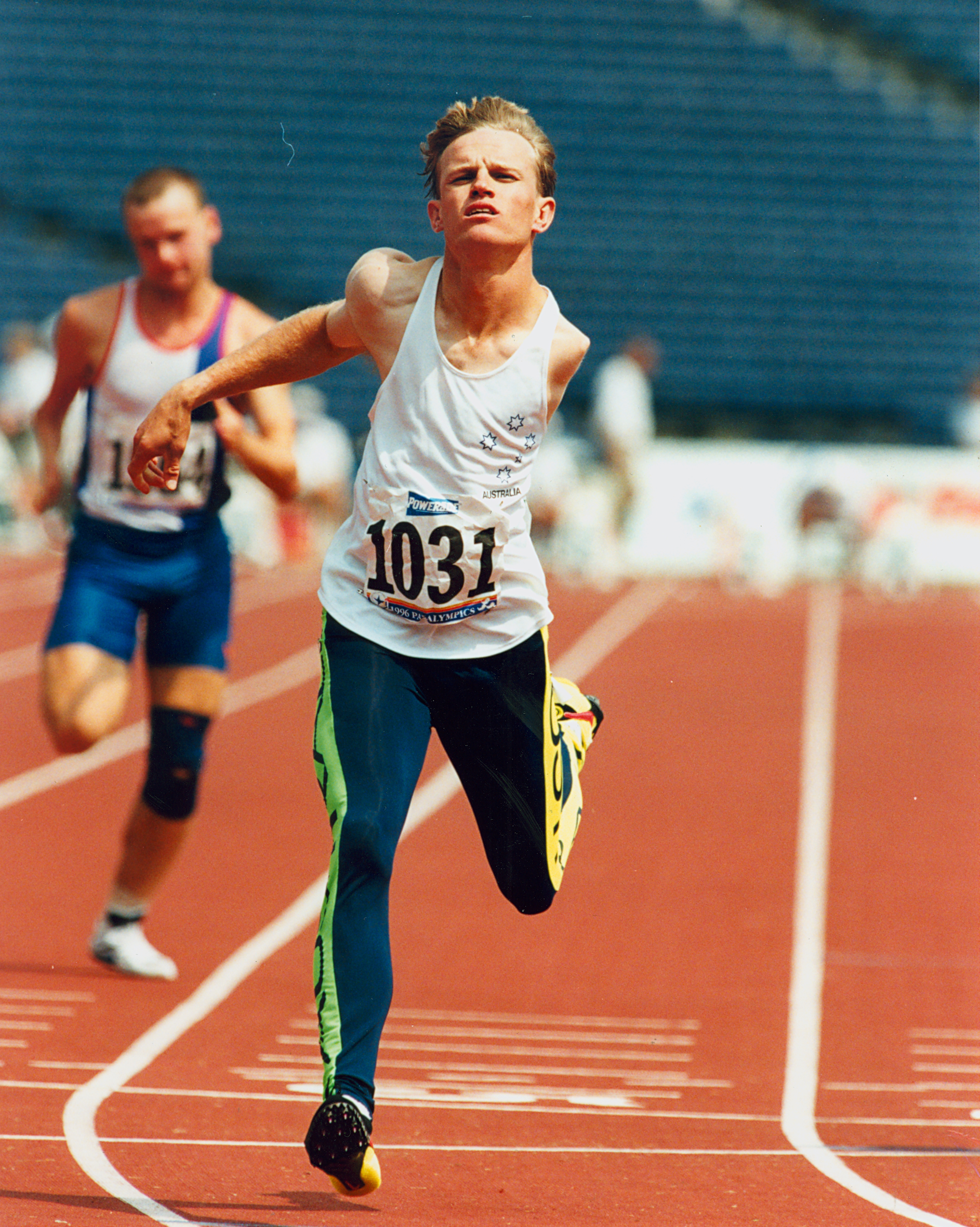
Australian T46 competitor Tim Matthews at the 1996 Paralympic Games.

T46 and F46 are disability sport classification for disability athletics. People in this class have a single below or above the elbow amputation. The amputee sports equivalent class is ISOD the A6 and A8 classes. People in this class can have injuries as a result of over use of their remaining upper limb. The classification process to be included in this class has four parts: a medical exam, observation during training, observation during competition and then being classified into this class.

== Definition ==
This classification is for disability athletics. T46 is for track events and F46 is for field events. This classification is one of several classifications for athletes with ambulant related disabilities. Similar classifications are T40, T42, T43, T44, T45 and T47. Jane Buckley, writing for the Sporting Wheelies, describes the athletes in this classification as: "Single above elbow/Single below elbow amputation or similar disability." The Australian Paralympic Committee defines this classification as being for athletes who have the "Single arm, above or below elbow amputation. Normal function in both lower limbs. Other impairments in trunk. Upper limb function in throwing." After the introduction of the T47 classification in 2013, the International Paralympic Committee redefined T46 as being for athletes who: "...have a unilateral upper limb impairment that affects the shoulder and/or elbow joint of one arm and which is comparable to the activity limitations in running and jumps roughly comparable to that found in an athlete with a unilateral above elbow amputation. Athletes who have impairments of both arms, affecting elbow and wrist and roughly comparable to the activity limitations experienced by an athlete with bilateral through wrist / below elbow amputations of both arms, or an athlete with one above elbow amputation and one below elbow amputation, will also be placed in this class". The International Paralympic Committee defined this classification on their website in July 2016 as, "Upper limb/s affected by limb deficiency, impaired muscle power or impaired range of movement".

This class includes people from the ISOD A6 and A8 classes.

== Disability groups ==
=== Amputees ===
People who are amputees compete in this class, including and A8. In general, track athletes with amputations in should be considerate of the surface they are running on, and avoid asphalt and cinder tracks.

==== Upper limb amputees ====
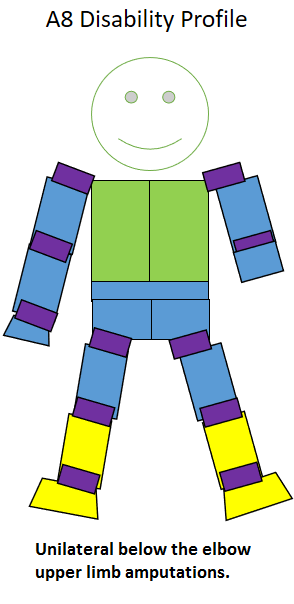
Type of amputation for an A8 classified sportsperson.

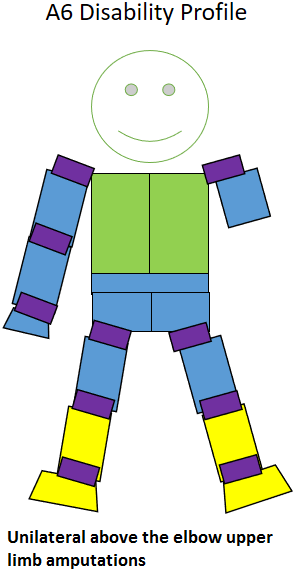
Type of amputation for an A6 classified sportsperson.

The nature of an A6 or A8 athletes's amputations in this class can effect their physiology and sports performance. Because they are missing a limb, amputees are more prone to overuse injuries in their remaining limbs. Common problems for intact upper limbs for people in this class include rotator cuffs tearing, shoulder impingement, epicondylitis and peripheral nerve entrapment.

A study of was done comparing the performance of athletics competitors at the 1984 Summer Paralympics when the ISOD classification system was in use. It found there was no significant difference in performance in times between women in A6, A7 and A8 in the discus, women in A6, A7 and A8 in the shot put, women in the A6, A7 and A8 in the long jump, women in A6, A7 and A8 in the 100 meter race, women in A5, A6, A7 and A8 in the 100 meter race, men in the A3, A4, A5, A6, A7, A8 and A9 in the discus, men in A6, A7 and A8 in the discus, men in A1, A2, A3, A4, A5, A6, A7, A8 and A9 in the javelin, men in A6, A7 and A8 in the javelin, men in A8 and A9 in the shot put, men in A6, A7 and A8 in the high jump, men in A6, A7 and A8 in the long jump, men in A6, A7 and A8 in the 100 meter race, men in A7 and A8 in the 400 meter race, and men in A7 and A8 in the 1,500 meter race.

=== Les Autres ===
People who are Les Autres compete in this class. This includes LAF4 and LAF6 classified athletes. In general, Les Autres classes cover sportspeople with locomotor disabilities regardless of their diagnosis.

==== LAF4 ====
LAF4 sportspeople in this class may compete in T46. This is a standing class for people with an upper limb deficiency impacting their joints in one or both arms. At the 1984 Summer Paralympics, LAF4, LAF5 and LAF6 track athletes had the 100 meters and 1,500 meters on their program. In field events, they had shot put, discus, javelin and club throws. No jumping events were on the program for these classes. There was a large range of sportspeople with different disabilities in this class at the 1984 Summer Paralympics.

LAF4 is an ambulant class for people who have difficulty moving or severe balance problems. They may use crutches on a daily basis. They have reduced upper limb functionality. Medically, this class includes people with contracture/ankylosis in joints of one limb and limited function in another limb. It means they have limited function in two limbs but to a lesser extent than LAF3. In terms of functional classification, this means the sportsperson is ambulatory with or without crutches and braces, has balance problems and reduced function in their throwing arm. For the 1984 Summer Paralympics, LAF4 sportspeople were described by the Games organizers as "ambulant, with or without crutches and/or braces. They had weakness in the dominant arm, causing reduced function."

==== LAF6 ====
LAF6 competitors can be classified into several athletics classes including F46. While athletes in this class have minimal functionality problems with their throwing arm, they have an impairment that impacts their non-throwing arm. At the 1984 Summer Paralympics, LAF4, LAF5 and LAF6 track athletes had the 100 meters and 1,500 meters on their program. In field events, they had shot put, discus, javelin and club throws. No jumping events were on the program for these classes. There was a large range of sportspeople with different disabilities in this class at the 1984 Summer Paralympics.

LAF6 is an Les Autres sports classification. It is an ambulant class for people with minimal issues with trunk and lower limb functionality. People in this class have impairments in one upper limb. Medically, this class includes people with arthritis and osteoporosis, or ankylosis of the knee. In practice, this means minimal disability. In terms of functional classification, this means the sportsperson is ambulatory with good upper limb functionality, and minimal trunk or lower limb functionality.

== Performance and rules ==
People in this class are not required to use a starting block. They have an option to start from a standing position, a crouch or a 3-point stance. In relay events involving T40s classes, no baton is used. Instead, a handoff takes place via touch in the exchange zone. People with arm amputations in this class can have elevated padded blocks to place their stumps on for the start of the race. These blocks need to be in a neutral color or a color similar to that of the track, and they must be placed entirely behind the starting line. Their location needs to be such that they do not interfere with the start of any other athlete.

In field events for this class, athletes are not required to wear a prosthetic. In jumping events, athletes have 60 seconds during which they must complete their jump. During this time, they can adjust their prosthetic. If during a jump, the athlete's prosthesis falls off, the jump length start should start from where the takeoff board and the distance is where the prosthesis fell off. If prosthesis falls off outside the landing zone nearer the board than where athlete landed, the jump counts as a foul.

In throwing events, implement weights are as follows:

Event	Male	Female
Shot put	6.00 kg (13.23 lb)	4.00 kg (8.82 lb)
Discus throw	1.50 kg (3.3 lb)	1.00 kg (2.20 lb)
Javelin throw	800 g (28 oz)	600 g (21 oz)

== Events ==
Qualification standards for the 2016 Summer Paralympics
Event	Men		Women	
Event	AQS	BQS	AQS	BQS
100 metres	11.25	11.60	13.60	14.60
200 metres	—		28.00	29.00
400 metres	50.80	53.50	1:06.00	1:15.00
1500 metres	4:15.00	4:29.00	—	
Marathon	2:45:00.00	3:00:00.00	—	
Long jump	6.45	6.10	4.45	4.00
High jump	1.65	1.50	—	
Javelin throw	44.00	39.00	22.00	18.00

== History ==
The classification was created by the International Paralympic Committee and has roots in a 2003 attempt to address "the overall objective to support and co-ordinate the ongoing development of accurate, reliable, consistent and credible sport focused classification systems and their implementation." There were changes made to the class in 2008, that made the category more selective by changing the minimum criteria to be eligible to compete in this classification.

For the 2016 Summer Paralympics in Rio, the International Paralympic Committee had a zero classification at the Games policy. This policy was put into place in 2014, with the goal of avoiding last minute changes in classes that would negatively impact athlete training preparations. All competitors needed to be internationally classified with their classification status confirmed prior to the Games, with exceptions to this policy being dealt with on a case-by-case basis. In case there was a need for classification or reclassification at the Games despite best efforts otherwise, athletics classification was scheduled for September 4 and September 5 at Olympic Stadium. For sportspeople with physical or intellectual disabilities going through classification or reclassification in Rio, their in competition observation event is their first appearance in competition at the Games.

== Becoming classified ==
Classification is often based on the anatomical nature of the amputation. The classification system takes several things into account when putting people into this class. These include which limbs are effected, how many limbs are affected, and how much of a limb is missing.

For this class, classification generally has four phase. The first stage of classification is a health examination. For amputees, this is often done on site at a sports training facility or competition. The second stage is observation in practice, the third stage is observation in competition and the last stage is assigning the sportsperson to a relevant class. Sometimes the health examination may not be done on site because the nature of the amputation could cause not physically visible alterations to the body. During the training portion of classification, observation may include being asked to demonstrate their skills in athletics, such as running, jumping or throwing. A determination is then made as to what classification an athlete should compete in. Classifications may be Confirmed or Review status. For athletes who do not have access to a full classification panel, Provisional classification is available; this is a temporary Review classification, considered an indication of class only, and generally used only in lower levels of competition.

== Competitors ==
Notable athletes in this class include T46 world record holders Dinesh Priyantha (SRI), Heath Francis (AUS), Gunther Matzinger (AUT) and Yunidis Castillo (CUB). Ajibola Adeoye's T46 100m world record, set at the 1992 Summer Paralympics, has not yet been beaten. Simon Patmore (AUS) and South African sprinter Zivan Smith also run in this class.

Madeleine Hogan (AUS) is a field competitor in this class, winner of the F46 javelin event at the 2011 IPC Athletics World Championships.
