= Disability classification in lawn bowls =

Disability sport classification system

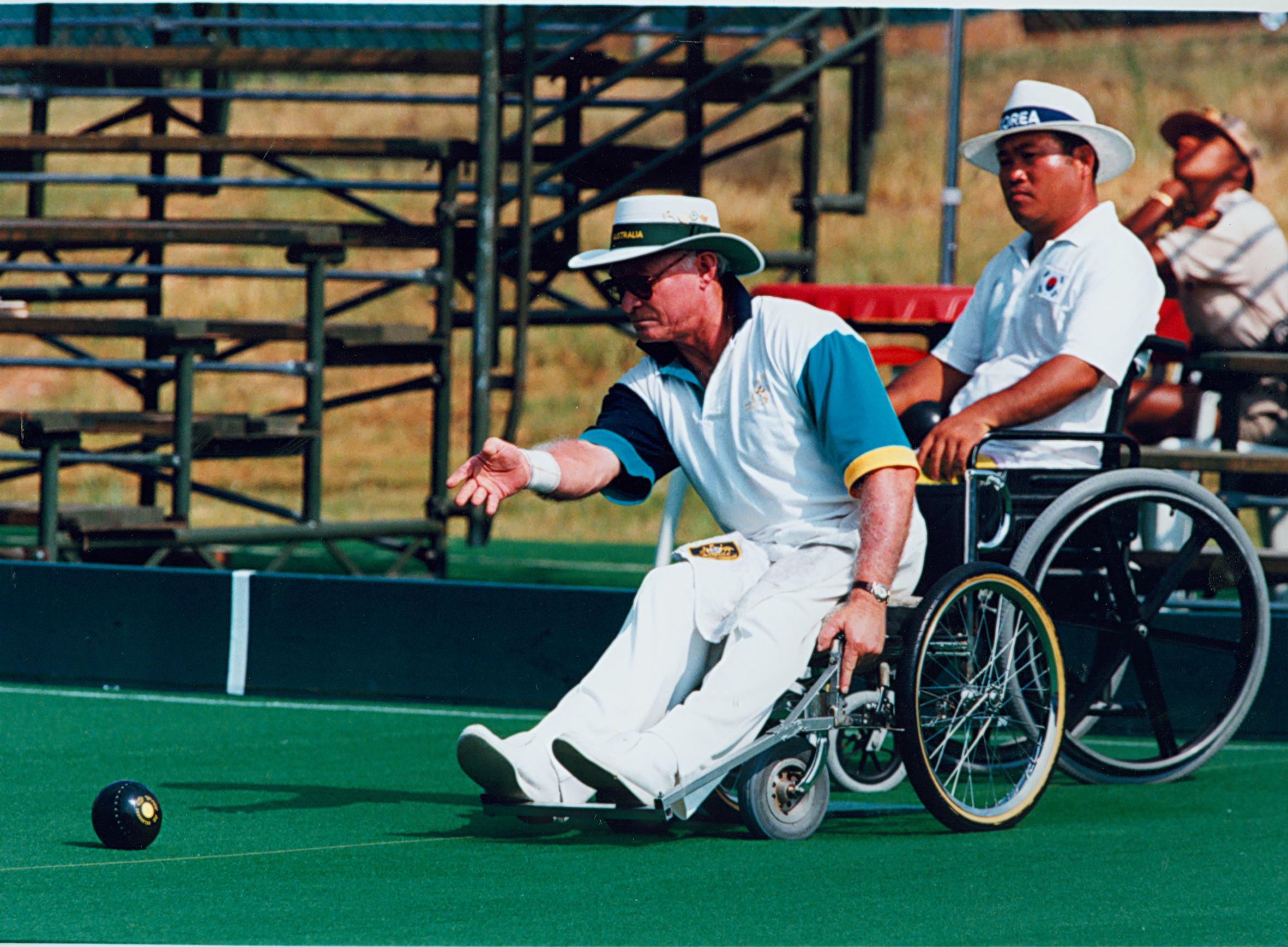
A wheelchair bowler at the 1996 Summer Paralympics

Bowls classification is the classification system for lawn bowls where players with a disability are classified into different categories based on their disability type. Classifications exist for blind bowlers. Bowls was played at the Paralympics and is a core sport of Commonwealth Games.

== Definition ==
Bowls has rules that were designed specifically with people with disabilities in mind. Classifications for this sport are based on functional mobility. The blind classifications are based on medical classification, not functional classification.

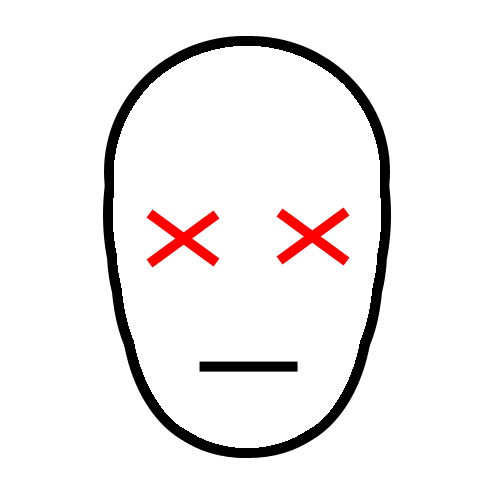
Visualisation of functional vision for a B1 competitor

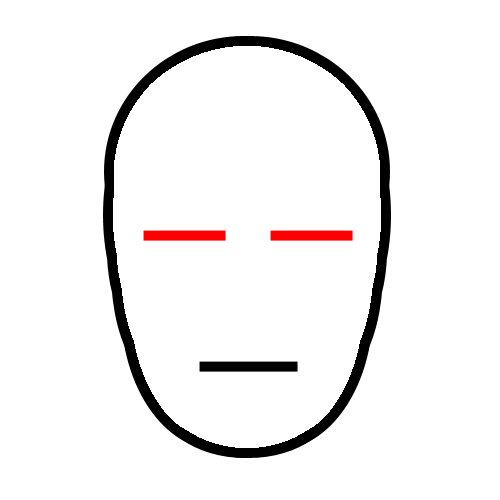
Visualisation of functional vision for a B2 competitor

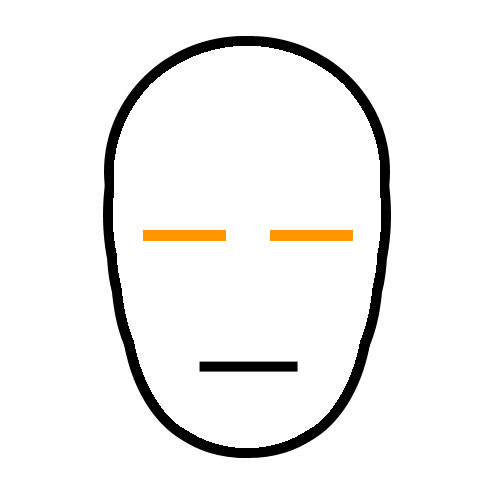
Visualisation of functional vision for a B3 competitor

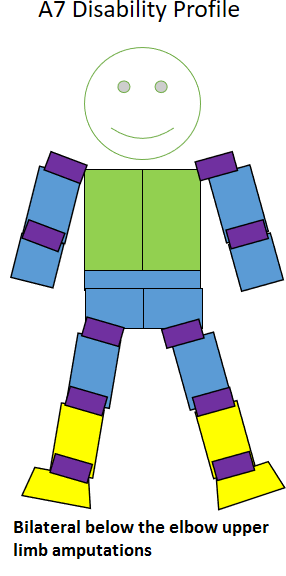
Visualization of an A7 classified bowler competing in LB3

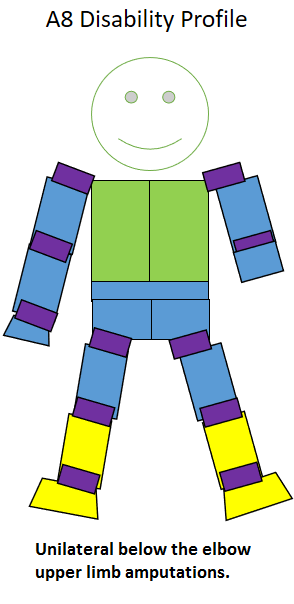
Visualization of an A8 classified bowler competing in LB3

There are a number of different classes in this sport. One class is LB3, which is a standing class. ISOD A7 and A8 are eligible to participate in this class.

== History ==
The visual impairment classification was part of the 1994 Commonwealth Games. Several classes in this sport were included in the 2002 Commonwealth Games.

== At the Paralympic Games ==
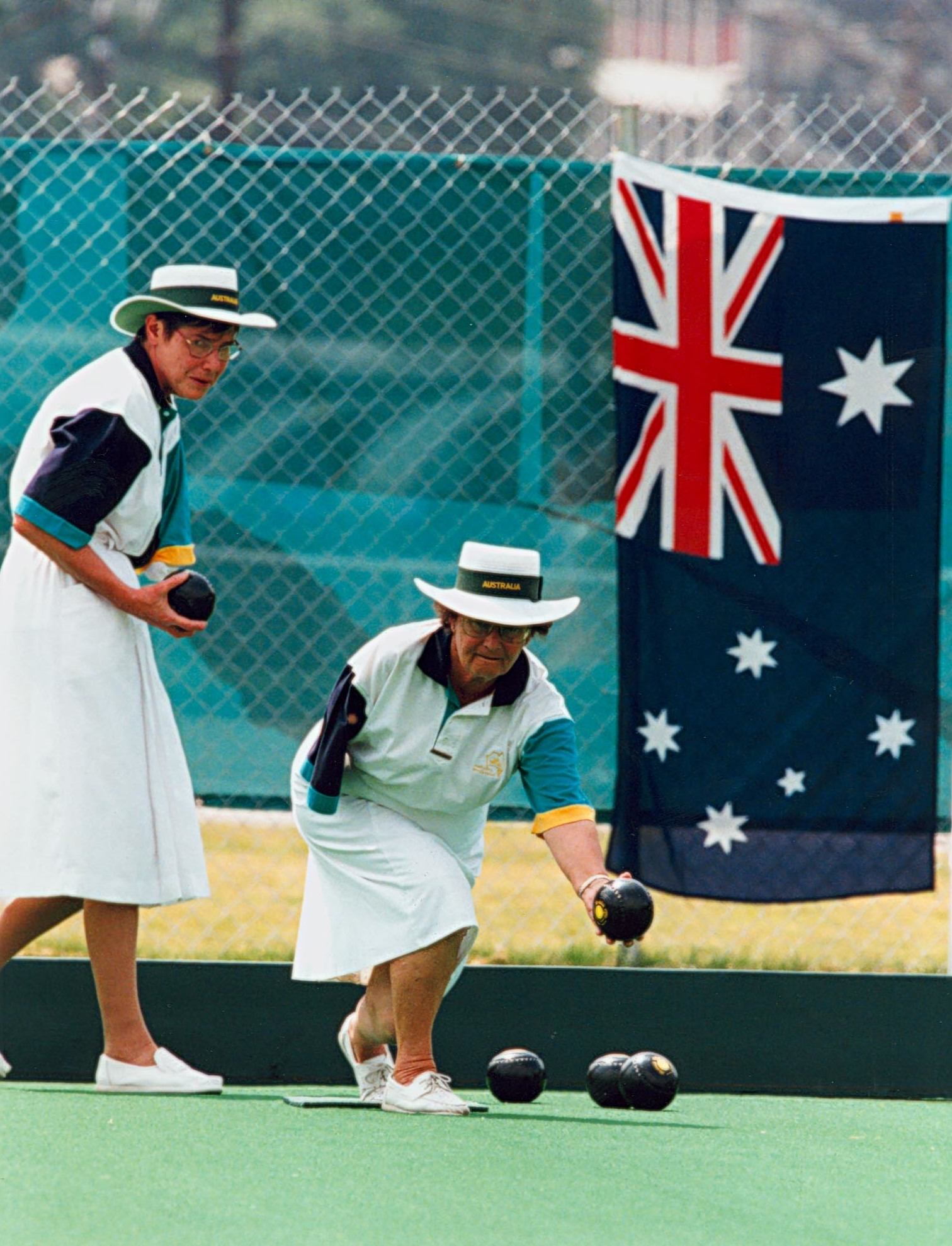
An amputee bowler at the 1996 Summer Paralympics

Competitors with cerebral palsy classifications were allowed to compete at the Paralympics for the first time at the 1984 Summer Paralympics. Bowls has dropped at the 1992 Summer Paralympics, returning on 1996 Summer Paralympics, and dropped again in 2000 Summer Paralympics, blind, wheelchair and amputee disability types were eligible to participate, with classification being run through the International Paralympic Committee, with classification being done based on wheelchair and blindness. Due the lack of participating countries during the Paralympic Games, the sport was removed from the Paralympic Games program in 1998.
