= Dilba Tanrıkulu =

Turkish track and field para-athlete

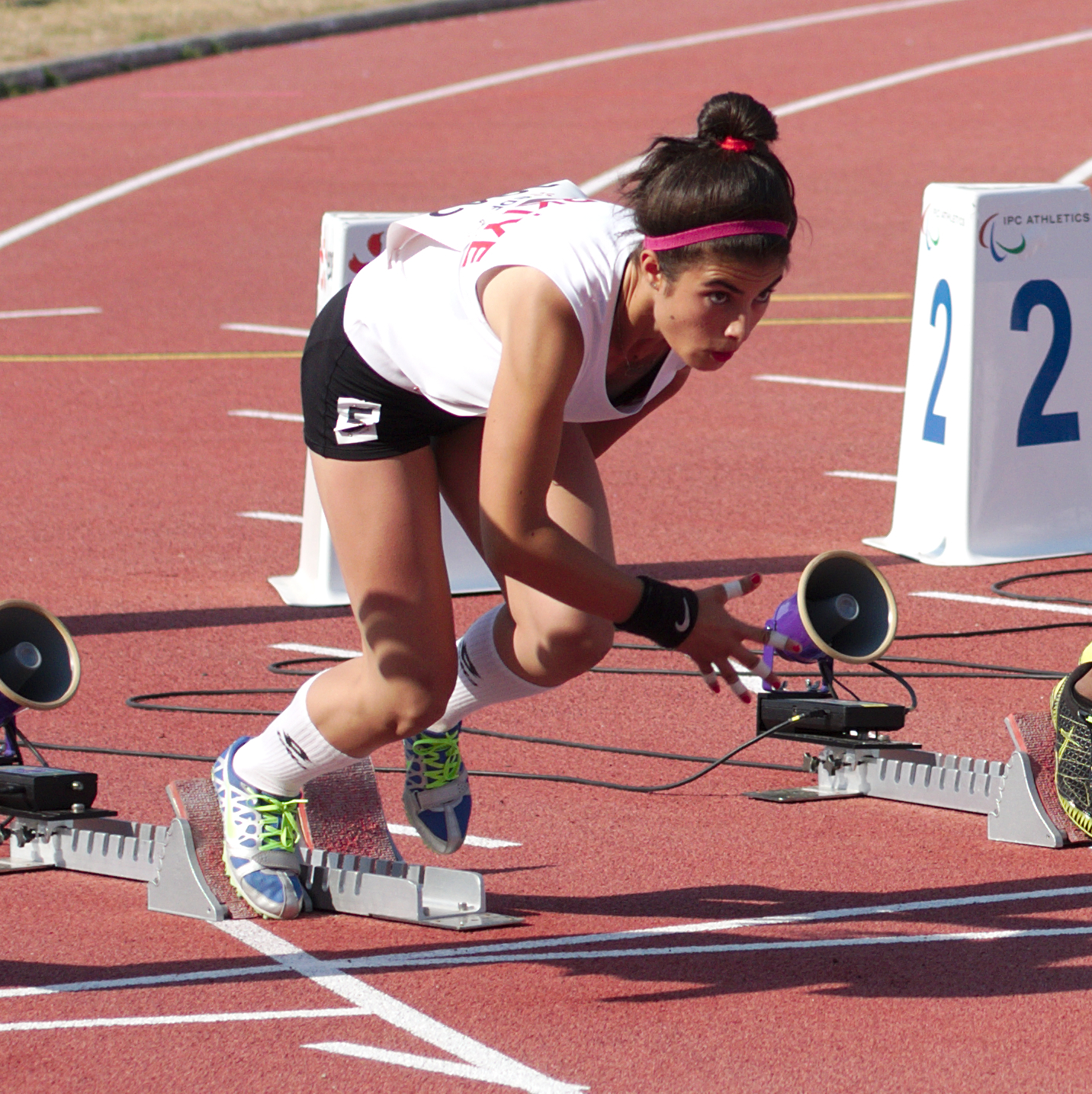
- Dilba Tanrıkulu at the 2013 IPC Athletics World Championships – Women's 100 metres

Personal information
- Born: 8 November 1998 (age 27) Mersin, Turkey

Sport
- Country: Turkey
- Sport: Paralympic athletics
- Disability class: T46, T47, F46, F47
- Event(s): 100m, 200m, long jump
- Coached by: Güler Yaşar
Medal record
Track and field
Representing Turkey

Dilba Tanrıkulu (born 8 November 1998) is a Turkish track and field para-athlete competing in the T46 and T47 disability classes sprint and F46 and F47 disability classes long jump events.

== Private life ==
Dilba Tanrıkulu was born to a construction worker father and a housewife mother in Mersin, Turkey on 8 November 1998. She has three siblings. She is disabled at a rate of 30% because her left shoulder nerves were severely damaged during her home birth. She completed her secondary education at Mersin Atatürk Vocational High School.

== Sports career ==
She began with athletics in 2010. She is a member of a disabled sports club in the neighbor city of Adana. She is coached by Güler Yaşar.

In 2013, she was admitted to the Turkey national team, and debuted the same year at the IPC Grand Prix held in Grosseto, Italy. She qualified for the 2013 IPC Athletics World Championships with her time of 13.52 exceeding the A-qualification standard for the 2016 Summer Paralympics (AQS) of 13.60, and her distance of 4.78m exceeding the AQS of 4.45m.
