= Carlee Beattie =

Australian Paralympic athlete

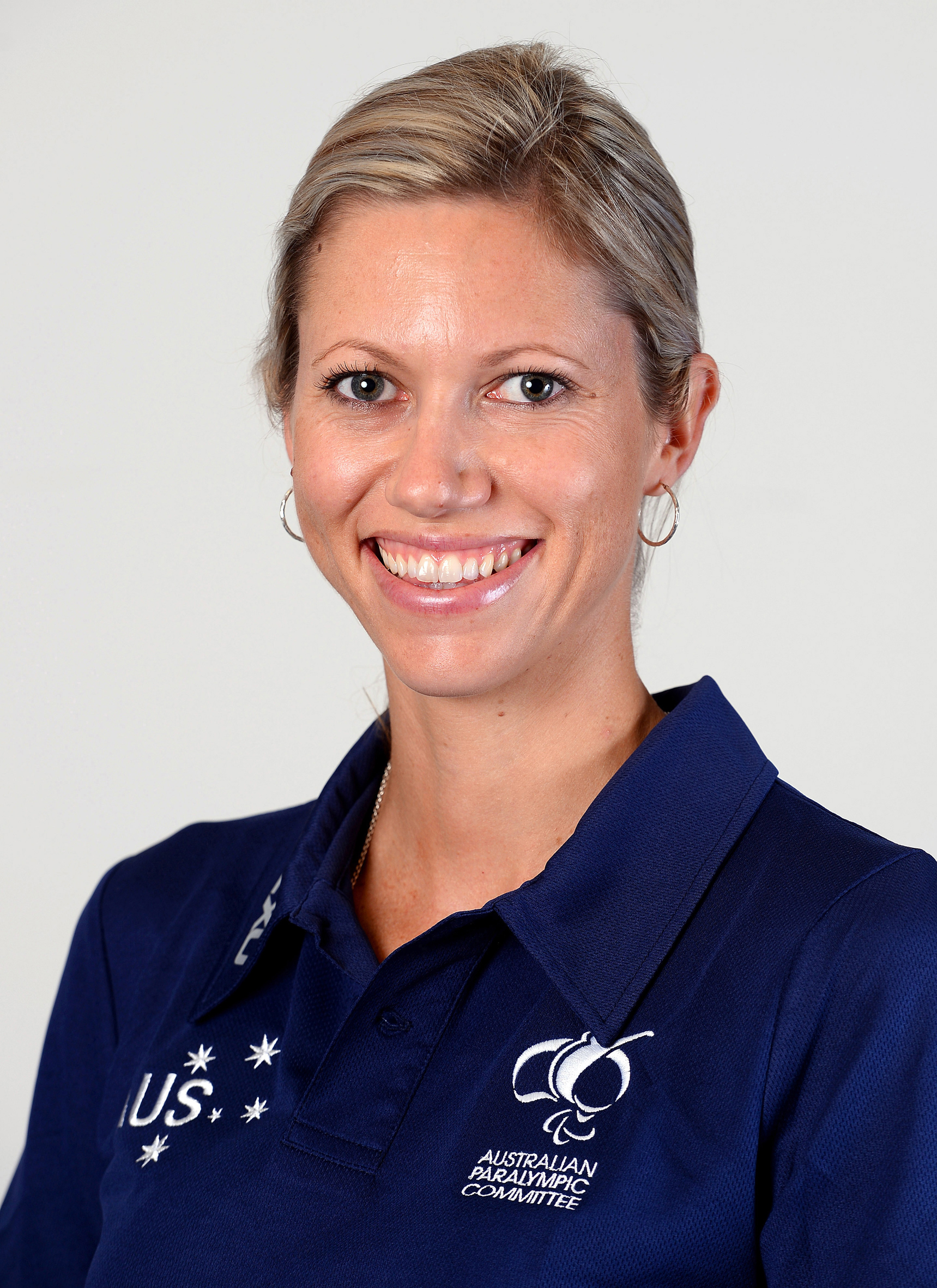
- 2016 Australian Paralympic team portrait of Beattie

Personal information
- Nationality: Australian
- Born: 9 September 1982 (age 44)

Sport
- Country: Australia
- Sport: Paralympic athletics
- Disability: Congenital arm amputee
- Disability class: T46, F46 T47

Achievements and titles
- Personal best: Long jump: 6.01m WR
Medal record
Representing Australia
Women's Athletics
Paralympic Games
Silver medal – second place	2012 London	Long Jump - F46
Bronze medal – third place	2016 Rio	Long Jump - T45/46/47F46
IPC Athletics World Championships
Gold medal – first place	2015 Doha	Women's Long Jump T47
Silver medal – second place	2011 Christchurch	Long Jump - F44/46
Silver medal – second place	2013 Lyon	Women's Long Jump F46
Bronze medal – third place	2011 Christchurch	100m - T46

Carlee Beattie (born 9 September 1982) is an Australian Paralympic athletics competitor. A congenital arm amputee, she won the silver medal at the 2012 Summer Paralympics and a gold medal at the 2015 IPC Athletics World Championships in the Women's Long Jump. She represented Australia at the 2016 Rio Paralympics.

== Personal ==
Beattie was born on 9 September 1982, and is from Warwick, Queensland, in the Brisbane area. She attended Warwick West, St Mary's, Assumption College and Warwick High School. As of 2012, she is studying to be a Nutritionist at the Endeavour College of Natural Health.

Her left arm is not fully formed, a condition she was born with, and is classified as an arm amputee. She has played other sports including field hockey and netball. She competed in the 2000 Netball State Titles, where she was named the competition's most valuable player.

In 2012, she was named one of Zoo Weekly's sexiest Paralympians.

== Athletics ==
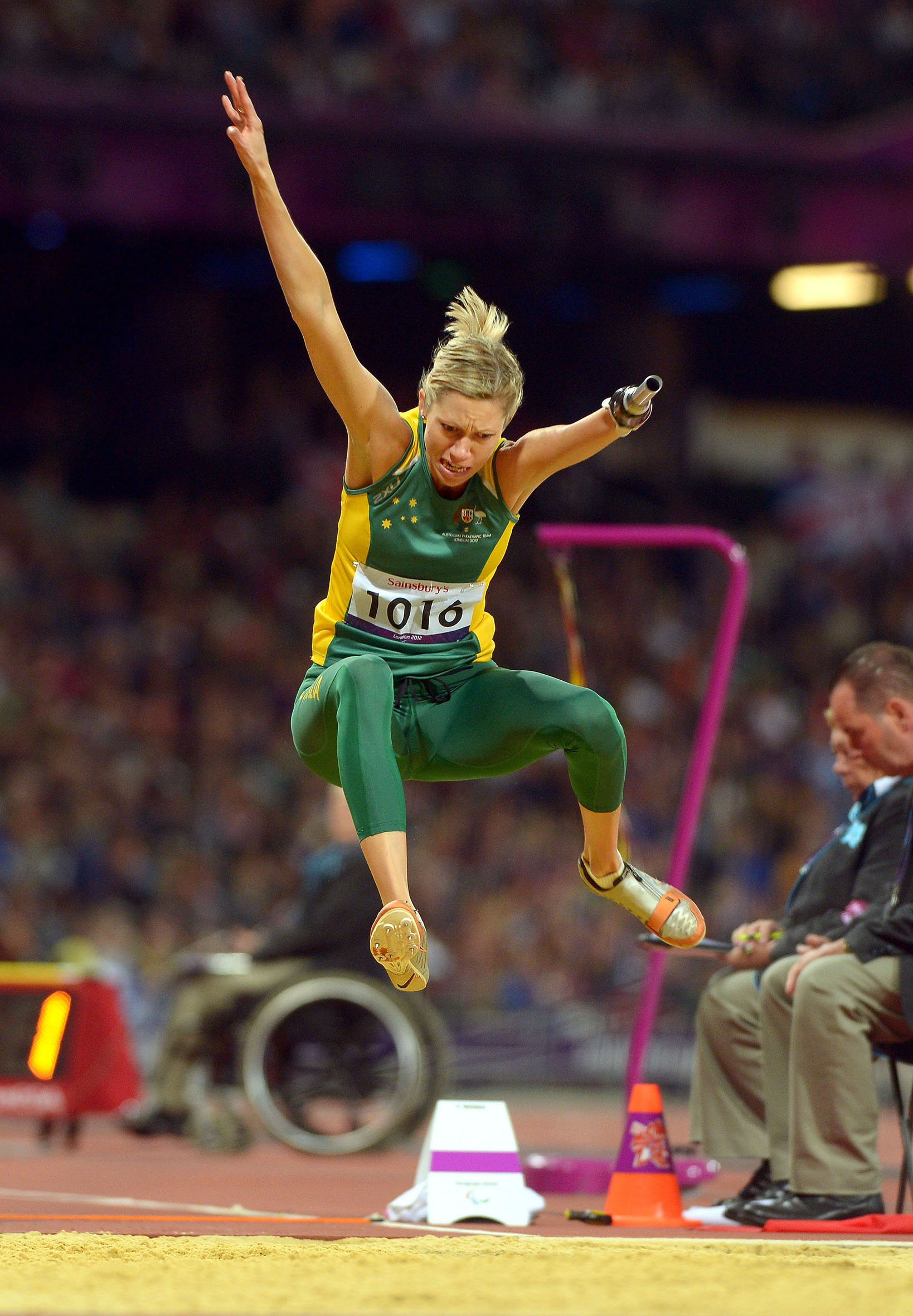
Beattie at the 2012 London Paralympics

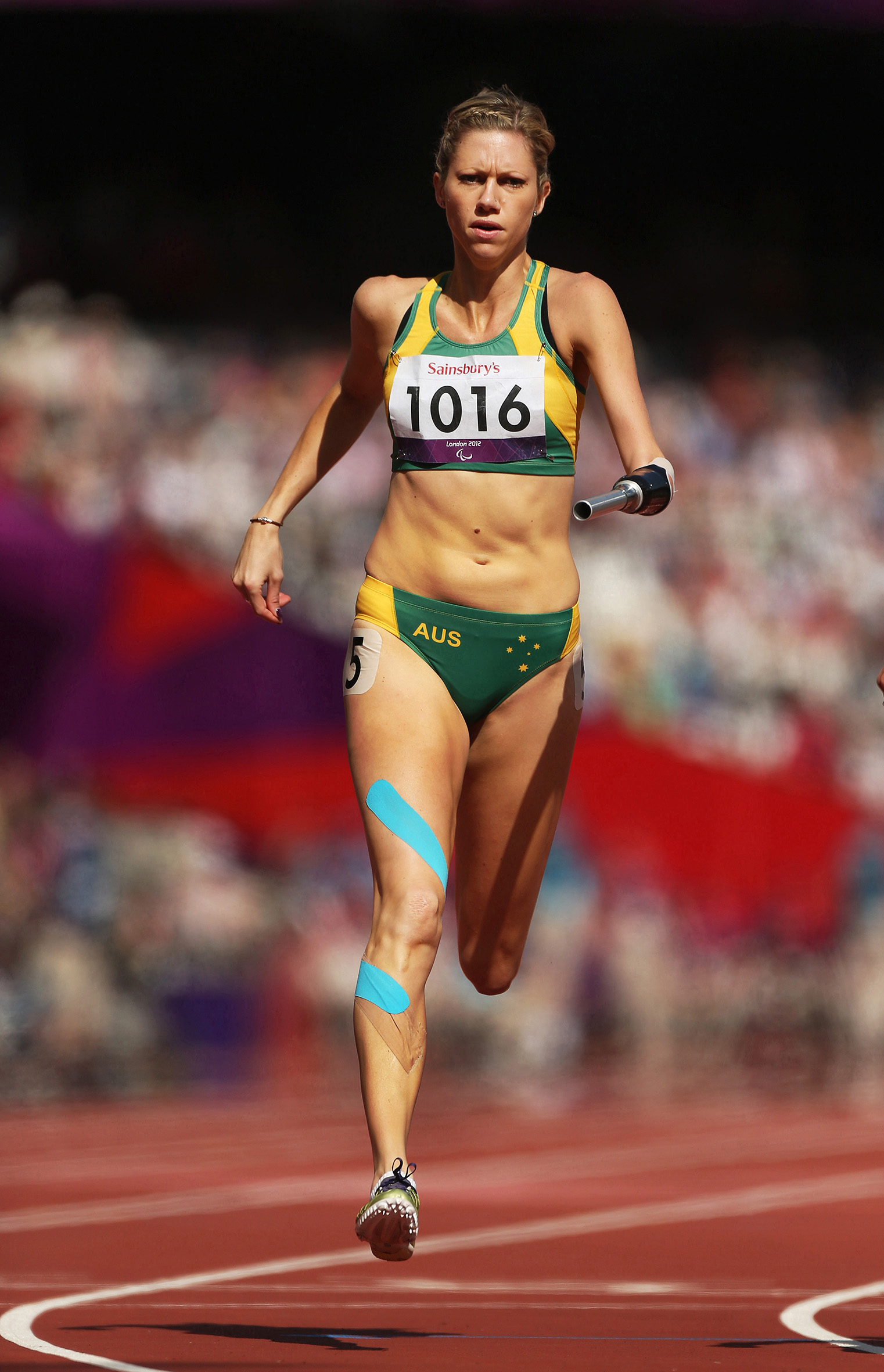
Beattie at the 2012 London Paralympics

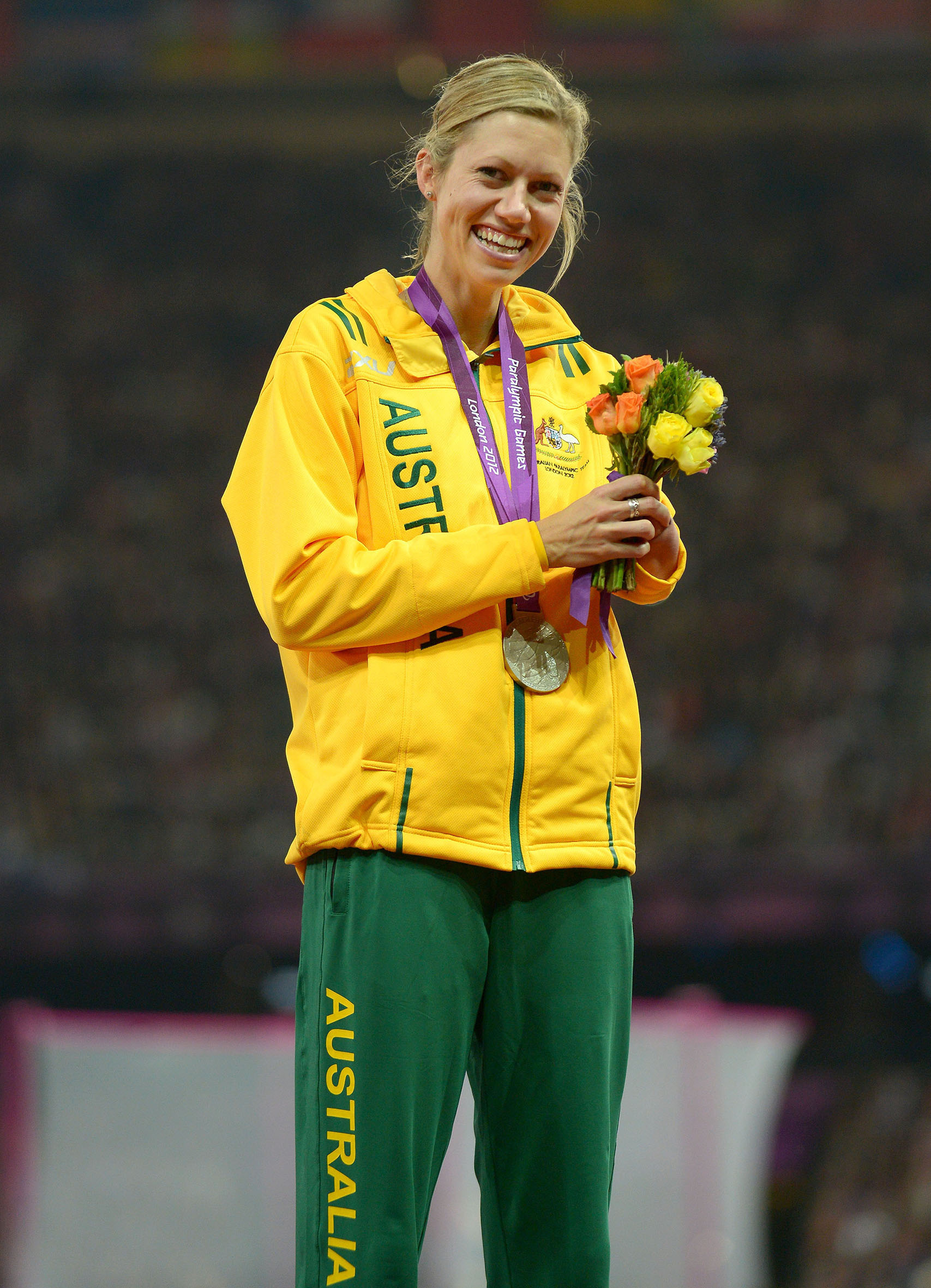
Beattie at the 2012 London Paralympics

Beattie is an F46 classified long jumper, 100 metre and 200 metre runner. She had participated in the javelin event but an early injury deterred her from making it a regular part of her competition schedule. As of 2011, she is coached by Brett Jones. She took up athletics at the encouragement of a teacher in 2007. She has held a world record of 5.89 metres in her classification in the long jump, a record she set in April 2011. She broke her March 2011 world record set at the March 2011 Sydney Grand Prix. In February 2013, she again broke her own long jump world record with a leap of 5.93 metres. She bettered this mark at her next meet, the 2013 Sydney Track Classic at Sydney Olympic Park in early March, eclipsing the 6 metre mark to set a new world record of 6.01 metres.

Beattie first represented Australia in 2008. She represented Australia at the 2008 Summer Paralympics in the long jump, 100 metre and 200 metre event, making the finals in none of her events. She competed in the 2010 Australian national titles, where she won the long jump event with a distance of 5.71 metres. She competed in the Australian national titles in April 2011, competing in both her classification and the able bodied athlete event. In the able bodied event, she finished eighth. She competed in the 2011 IPC World Athletics Championships in Christchurch, New Zealand finishing second in the long jump and third in the 100 metre event. She was selected to represent Australia at the 2012 Summer Paralympics in athletics. In November 2011, she was debating using a prosthetic arm while competing at the London Paralympics. The limb would have cost A$5,000. She won the silver medal in the Women's Long Jump - F46 at the 2012 Games. She made the finals of the T46 100 meters, but was unable to run the final due to an adductor tear in her groin.

At the 2013 IPC Athletics World Championships in Lyon, France, she won a silver medal in the Women's Long Jump F46.

Beattie won her first gold medal in a major international competition by winning the Women's Long Jump T47 at the 2015 IPC Athletics World Championships in Doha with a jump of 5.75m. Beattie commented on winning gold "I’ve always been the bridesmaid and to have this before Rio is such a massive confidence boost. It will give me the drive to keep going, to want it even more and to make sure that I can do the same thing again at the Paralympic Games.”

At the 2016 Rio Paralympics, she won the bronze medal in the Women's Long Jump T45/46/47 with a jump of 5.57m, which as 5 cm behind the winner Anna Grimaldi.

She is coached by Gary Bourne.
