= Tanrıkulu =

Tanrıkulu is a Turkish surname. Its meaning in the Turkish language is "Servant of God".

Notable people with this surname include:

- Ahmet Kenan Tanrıkulu (born 1958), Turkish politician
- Azize Tanrıkulu (born 1986), Turkish female taekwondo athlete
- Bahri Tanrıkulu (born 1980), Turkish taekwondo athlete
- Dilba Tanrıkulu (born 1998), Turkish female para-athlete
- Sezgin Tanrıkulu, Turkish human rights lawyer
- Tina Tanrıkulu, formerly known as Tina Morgan (born 1982), Australian taekwondo athlete
