= A6 (classification) =

Amputee sports classification

A6 is an amputee sport classification used by the International Sports Organization for the Disabled (ISOD) for people with acquired or congenital amputations. People in this class have one arm amputated above or through the elbow joint. Their amputations impact their sport performance, including being more prone to overuse injuries. Sports people in this class are eligible to participate in include athletics, swimming, cycling, amputee basketball, amputee football, lawn bowls, and sitzball.

== Definition ==
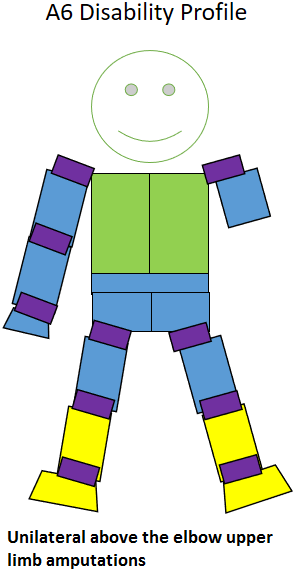
Type of amputation for an A6 classified sportsperson.

This class is for people who have one arm amputated above or through the elbow joint. This classification is sometimes abbreviated as A/E. In competing in some sports, this class may have a different name:

Class	Abbr	Athletics	Cycling	Skiing	Swimming	Comparable classifications in other sports	Ref
A6	A/E	T46, F46	LC1	LW6/8.1	S7, S8, S9	Amputee basketball: Open. Amputee football: Goalkeeper. Lawn bowls: LB3. Sitzball: Open. Ten-pin bowling: TPB10.	

== Performance ==
The nature of a person's amputations in this class can effect their physiology and sports performance. Because they are missing a limb, amputees are more prone to overuse injuries in their remaining limbs. Common problems for intact upper limbs for people in this class include rotator cuffs tearing, shoulder impingement, epicondylitis and peripheral nerve entrapment.

== Governance ==
This classification was set up by ISOD, with the current version adopted in 1992 and then modified in 1993. IWAS was created following the merger of ISOD and International Stoke Mandeville Games Federation (ISMGF) in 2005. Subsequently, IWAS became the classification governing body for some amputee sports.

== Sports ==
=== Athletics ===
For athletics competitions that use the IPC athletics classification system, this class competes in T46 and F46. A study of was done comparing the performance of athletics competitors at the 1984 Summer Paralympics. It found there was no significant difference in performance in times between women in A6, A7 and A8 in the discus, women in A6, A7 and A8 in the shot put, women in the A6, A7 and A8 in the long jump, women in A5 and A6 in the 100 meter race, women in A6, A7 and A8 in the 100 meter race, women in A5, A6, A7 and A8 in the 100 meter race, men in the A3, A4, A5, A6, A7, A8 and A9 in the discus, men in A6, A7 and A8 in the discus, men in A1, A2, A3, A4, A5, A6, A7, A8 and A9 in the javelin, men in A6, A7 and A8 in the javelin, men in A4, A5 and A6 in the high jump, men in A6, A7 and A8 in the high jump, men in A5, A6 and A7 in the long jump, men in A6, A7 and A8 in the long jump, men in A5 and A6 in the 100 meter race, men in A6, A7 and A8 in the 100 meter race, men in A5, A6 and A7 in the 100 meter race, men in A6 and A7 in the 400 meter race, men in A5, A6 and A7 in the 400 meter race, men in A5 and A6 in the 1,500 meter race, and men in A6 and A7 in the 1,500 meter race.

=== Basketball ===
There is a basketball variant called amputee basketball. It uses the ISOD classification system as to whom is eligible to participate, but it is open in terms of all eligible classes, including this one, can play. There is no point system for who is allowed on the floor at any given time like there is in wheelchair basketball.

=== Cycling ===
People in this class tend to be classified in cycling events as LC1. The class is for cyclists with upper limb disabilities including amputations.

=== Football ===
One of the sports available to people in this class is amputee football. There are two variants of the game, one with 4 players a side and one with 7 players a side. In both variants, A2 and A4 players must be field players while A6 and A8 players must be goalkeepers. In the 4 person variant, there are two halves of 15 minutes each. In the 7 person variant, there are two halves of 25 minutes each.

=== Swimming ===
People with amputations are eligible to compete in swimming at the Paralympic Games. A6 swimmers may be found in several classes. These include S7, S8, and S9. Prior to the 1990s, this class was often grouped with other amputee classes in swimming competitions, including the Paralympic Games. S8 and S9 swimmers in this class have similar start times to people with legs amputations in S8 to S10 classes. Because their legs are their greatest strength, they modify their entry into the water to take advantage of this. Compared to able bodied swimmers, swimmers in this class have a shorter stroke length and increased stroke rate.

A study of was done comparing the performance of swimming competitors at the 1984 Summer Paralympics. It found there was no significant difference in performance in times between women in A4, A5 and A6 the 100 meter 100 meter freestyle, men in A5 and A6 in the 100 meter freestyle, women in A5 and A6 in the 50 meter butterfly, women in A4, A5 and A6 in the 4 x 50 meter individual medley, men in A5 and A6 in the 4 x 50 meter individual medley, men and women in A4, A5 and A6 in the 100 meter backstroke, and men and women in the A4, A5 and A6 in the 100 meter breaststroke.

=== Other sports ===
Lawn bowls is one of the sports open to people in this class. A6 competitors can be classified as LB3. This is a standing class. Another sport open to people in this class is sitzball, the precursor to sitting volleyball. It is open to A1 to A9 classified players along with anyone who might be classified as "les autres" or who have lesser amputations that would not qualify them for ISOD classification. It is not open to people with spinal cord injuries. Play is open, with no requirements as to which types of disabilities are on the court at any time. Ten pin bowling is also open to people in this class. They compete in the TPB10 class. Rowing is another sport open to people with amputations. In 1991, the first internationally accepted adaptive rowing classification system was established and put into use. People from this class were initially classified as A1 for people with single limb amputations.

== Becoming classified ==
Classification is often based on the anatomical nature of the amputation. The classification system takes several things into account when putting people into this class. These include which limbs are effected, how many limbs are effected, and how much of a limb is missing.

For this class, classification generally has four phases. The first stage of classification is a health examination. For amputees, this is often done on site at a sports training facility or competition. The second stage is observation in practice, the third stage is observation in competition and the last stage is assigning the sportsperson to a relevant class. Sometimes the health examination may not be done on site because the nature of the amputation could cause not physically visible alterations to the body.

During the observation phase involving training or practice for track and field, athletes in this class may be asked to demonstrate their skills in athletics, such as running, jumping or throwing. A determination is then made as to what classification an athlete should compete in. Classifications may be Confirmed or Review status. For athletes who do not have access to a full classification panel, Provisional classification is available; this is a temporary Review classification, considered an indication of class only, and generally used only in lower levels of competition.
