= Endeavour College of Natural Health =

Endeavour College of Natural Health formerly Australian College of Natural Medicine
- Type: Private
- Established: 1975
- Location: Fortitude Valley, Southport, Melbourne, Adelaide, Sydney, East Perth, Queensland, Victoria, South Australia, New South Wales, Western Australia country =Australia students =
- Campus: Suburban address =Level 2, 269 Wickham Street, Fortitude Valley, Queensland, Australia telephone =
- Website: endeavour.edu.au affiliations =

Endeavour College of Natural Health is a private education institution located in multiple campuses across Australia, specialising in alternative medicine.

== History ==
Endeavour College of Natural Health was established in 1975, originally under the name Australian College of Natural Medicine. This remains the legal entity. The College is a 'dual sector' private education provider, meaning it offers higher education and vocational education and training (VET) courses.

In higher education, Endeavour offers Bachelor of Health Science degrees in a range of complementary medicine modalities such as naturopathy, acupuncture and Chinese medicine, and also offers a conventional Bachelor of Health Science degree in nutritional and dietetic medicine. The College also offers a higher education Diploma of Health Science for those looking to learn more about the complementary medicine fields prior to stepping into a degree.

VET courses in various alternative modalities are also provided by the College, ranging from the certificate level to diplomas.

Endeavour operates several Australian campuses in Brisbane, the Gold Coast, Melbourne, Adelaide, Sydney and Perth.

In 2015, the college was sold by its parent company Vocation to Study Group International for AUS$75 million. In 2018, Study Group International sold off its most valuable asset, Endeavour, to Allegro Funds at a staggering loss to repay significant government debts. Allegro Funds operating as Education Bidco remains the private equity owner.

== Criticism ==
In 2010, an audit by the Australian Universities Quality Agency reported that "students expressed the view that the college does not take sufficient responsibility for the student experience" and that the college "has a number of cultural challenges which it must overcome and these go to the core of how the college is operating as a higher education provider", noting a lack of managerial oversight and a need for clearer oversight of decision-making. Re-registration of the College as a higher education provider in 2014 showed most of these issues had been addressed appropriately.

It has also come under additional criticism since the 2015 Review of the Australian Government Rebate on Private Health Insurance for Natural Therapies. The college submitted a statement to this review, including claiming efficacy of pseudomedicine methods including homeopathy, Its former lecturers have also received criticism for their spreading anti-vaccination misinformation.
