= LC1 (classification) =

Para-cycling classification

LC1 is a para-cycling classification. It includes a number of types of people with disabilities including people with amputation and spinal cord injuries that are mostly confined to the upper limbs. This class includes people from the ISOD A5 class, A6 class, A7 class and A8 class.

== Definition ==
In 2000, BBC Sport defined this classification as "Amputee, Spinal Cord Injury and Les Autre competitors compete within the classification groupings LC1 - essentially for riders with upper limb disabilities," In 2008, BBC Sport defined this classification was "LC1: Riders with upper limb disabilities" In 2008, the Australian Broadcasting Corporation defined this classification was "Locomotor Disabilities (LC): Cyclists with a physical disability compete in four classes - LC1, LC2, LC3, LC4 - based on functional ability, with separate events for men and women." The Australian Paralympic Education Program defined this classification in 2012 as: "Riders with upper limb disabilities" This class includes people from the ISOD A8 class.

== Disability groups ==
=== Amputees ===
==== Upper limb amputees ====
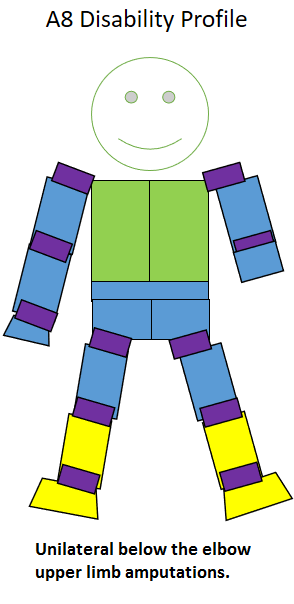
Type of amputation for an A8 classified sportsperson.

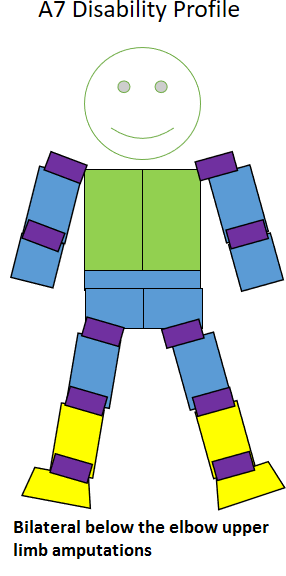
Type of amputation for an A7 classified sportsperson.

One of the groups of people competing in this class is people with upper limb amputations from ISOD A5, A6, A7 and A8 classes. The nature of a person's amputations in this class can effect their physiology and sports performance. Because they are missing a limb, amputees are more prone to overuse injuries in their remaining limbs. Common problems for intact upper limbs for people in this class include rotator cuffs tearing, shoulder impingement, epicondylitis and peripheral nerve entrapment.

== Classification history ==
Cycling first became a Paralympic sport at the 1988 Summer Paralympics. In September 2006, governance for para-cycling passed from the International Paralympic Committee's International Cycling Committee to UCI at a meeting in Switzerland. When this happened, the responsibility of classifying the sport also changed.

For the 2016 Summer Paralympics in Rio, the International Paralympic Committee had a zero classification at the Games policy. This policy was put into place in 2014, with the goal of avoiding last minute changes in classes that would negatively impact athlete training preparations. All competitors needed to be internationally classified with their classification status confirmed prior to the Games, with exceptions to this policy being dealt with on a case-by-case basis.

== Events ==
Events for this classification include the 1 km Time Trial.

== Competitors ==
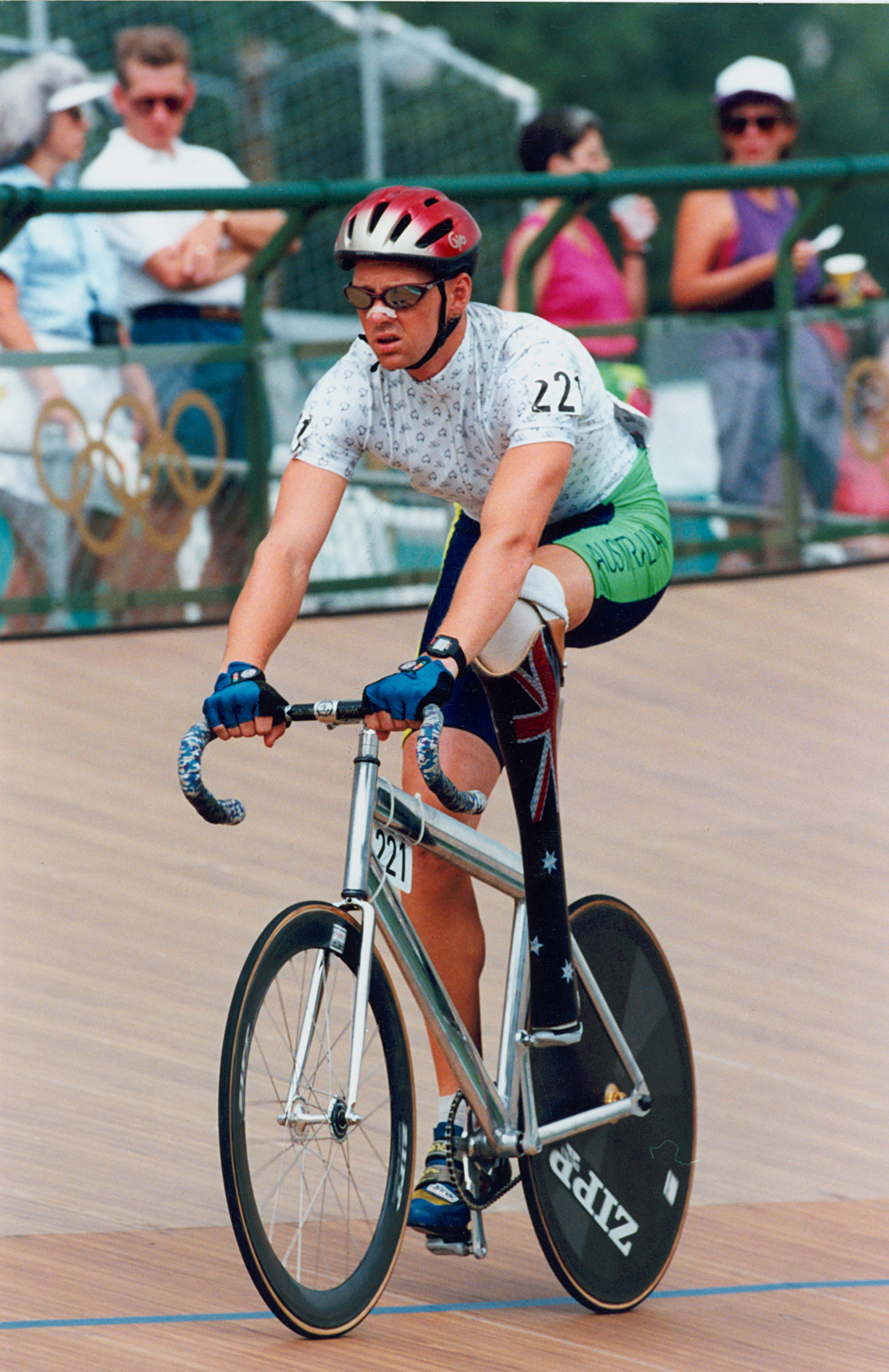
Australian cyclist Paul Lake won a silver medal in the LC1 omnium event on the track at the 1996 Summer Paralympics

LC1 competitors include Mark Bristow from Great Britain who has won a gold medal at the Paralympics.

== Historical world records ==
Below are some historical world records for this classification in the 200m men's Indoor track / Flying start.

Time	Cyclist	Country	Classification	Date and location	Country location	Reference
13"020	Francisco Trujillo	FRA	LC 1 Bicycle	02.06.1994 GENT	BEL
12"310	Wolfgang Eibeck	AUT	LC 1 Bicycle	03.08.1995 AUGSBURG	GER

== Becoming classified ==
Classification is handled by Union Cycliste Internationale. Classification generally has four phase. The first stage of classification is a health examination. For amputees, this is often done on site at a sports training facility or competition. The second stage is observation in practice, the third stage is observation in competition and the last stage is assigning the sportsperson to a relevant class. Sometimes the health examination may not be done on site because the nature of the amputation could cause not physically visible alterations to the body.
