= A7 (classification) =

Amputee sports classification

A7 is an amputee sport classification used by the International Sports Organization for the Disabled (ISOD) for people with acquired or congenital amputations. A7 sportspeople have both arms amputated below the elbow, but through or above the wrist joint. Their amputations impact their sport performance, including being more prone to overuse injuries. Sports people in this class are eligible to participate in include athletics, swimming, cycling, lawn bowls, and sitzball.

== Definition ==
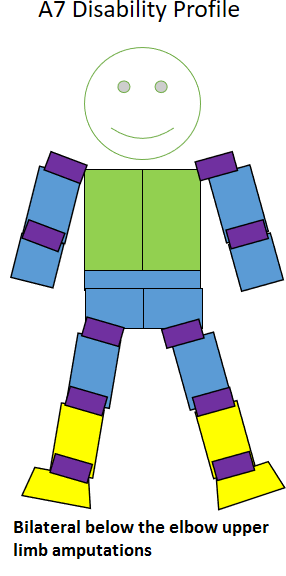
Type of amputation for an A7 classified sportsperson.

This class is for people who have both arms amputated below the elbow, but through or above the wrist joint. This classification is sometimes abbreviated as B/E. In competing in some sports, this class may have a different name:

Class	Abbr	Athletics	Cycling	Skiing	Swimming	Comparable classifications in other sports	Ref
A7	B/E	T45, F45	LC1	LW 5/7-3	S7	Lawn bowls: LB3. Sitzball: Open.	

== Performance ==
The nature of a person's amputations in this class can affect their physiology and sports performance. Because they are missing a limb, amputees are more prone to overuse injuries in their remaining limbs. Common problems for intact upper limbs for people in this class include rotator cuffs tearing, shoulder impingement, epicondylitis and peripheral nerve entrapment.

== Governance ==
This classification was set up by ISOD, with the current version adopted in 1992 and then modified in 1993. IWAS was created following the merger of ISOD and International Stoke Mandeville Games Federation (ISMGF) in 2005. Subsequently, IWAS became the classification governing body for some amputee sports.

== Sports ==
=== Athletics ===
For athletics competitions that use the IPC athletics classification system, this class competes in T45 and F45. A study of was done comparing the performance of athletics competitors at the 1984 Summer Paralympics. It found there was no significant difference in performance in times between women in A6, A7 and A8 in the discus, women in A6, A7 and A8 in the shot put, women in the A6, A7 and A8 in the long jump, women in A6, A7 and A8 in the 100 meter race, women in A5, A6, A7 and A8 in the 100 meter race, men in the A3, A4, A5, A6, A7, A8 and A9 in the discus, men in A6, A7 and A8 in the discus, men in A1, A2, A3, A4, A5, A6, A7, A8 and A9 in the javelin, men in A6, A7 and A8 in the javelin, men in A6, A7 and A8 in the high jump, men in A5, A6 and A7 in the long jump, men in A6, A7 and A8 in the long jump, men in A6, A7 and A8 in the 100 meter race, men in A5, A6 and A7 in the 100 meter race, men in A6 and A7 in the 400 meter race, men in A5, A6 and A7 in the 400 meter race, men in A7 and A8 in the 400 meter race, men in A6 and A7 in the 1,500 meter race, and men in A7 and A8 in the 1,500 meter race.

In general, track athletes with amputations in this class should be considerate of the surface they are running on, and avoid asphalt and cinder tracks.

=== Cycling ===
People in this class tend to be classified in cycling events as LC1. The class is for cyclists with upper limb disabilities including amputations. Classification is handled by Union Cycliste Internationale.

=== Swimming ===
People with amputations are eligible to compete in swimming at the Paralympic Games. A7 swimmers may be found in several classes. These include S7. Prior to the 1990s, this class was often grouped with other amputee classes in swimming competitions, including the Paralympic Games. Because their legs are their greatest strength, they modify their entry into the water to take advantage of this. Compared to able bodied swimmers, swimmers in this class have a shorter stroke length and increased stroke rate.

=== Other sports ===
Lawn bowls is one of the sports open to people in this class, where they are generally classified as LB3. This is a standing class. People in this class have the option to wear a prostheses. Another sport open to people in this class is sitzball, the precursor to sitting volleyball. It is open to A1 to A9 classified players along with anyone who might be classified as "les autres" or who have lesser amputations that would not qualify them for ISOD classification. It is not open to people with spinal cord injuries. Play is open, with no requirements as to which types of disabilities are on the court at any time. Rowing is another sport open to people with amputations. In 1991, the first internationally accepted adaptive rowing classification system was established and put into use. People from this class were initially classified as A2 for people with double amputations.

== Becoming classified ==
Classification is often based on the anatomical nature of the amputation. The classification system takes several things into account when putting people into this class. These include which limbs are affected, how many limbs are affected, and how much of a limb is missing.

For this class, classification generally has four phase. The first stage of classification is a health examination. For amputees, this is often done on site at a sports training facility or competition. The second stage is observation in practice, the third stage is observation in competition and the last stage is assigning the sportsperson to a relevant class. Sometimes the health examination may not be done on site because the nature of the amputation could cause not physically visible alterations to the body.

During the observation phase involving training or practice for track and field, athletes in this class may be asked to demonstrate their skills in athletics, such as running, jumping or throwing. A determination is then made as to what classification an athlete should compete in. Classifications may be Confirmed or Review status. For athletes who do not have access to a full classification panel, Provisional classification is available; this is a temporary Review classification, considered an indication of class only, and generally used only in lower levels of competition.
